= List of works by El Greco =

El Greco (1541–1614) was a Cretan-born painter, sculptor and architect of the Spanish Renaissance. El Greco left his birthplace for Venice in 1567, never to return. El Greco's three years in Venice profoundly influenced his style. In 1577, he emigrated to Toledo, Spain, where he lived and worked until the end of his life.

El Greco's artworks are thus divided into three main periods:

- Works he painted while he was still in Crete
- Works he painted while he was still in Venice and Rome
- Works he painted while he was still in Toledo

El Greco was mainly a painter but a few sculptures, including Epimetheus and Pandora, have also been attributed to him. This doubtful attribution is based on the testimony of Pacheco, who claimed to see a series of wax, stucco, and wooden figurines in his studio, but these may have been models like those used in the Italian workshops (like the one El Greco himself had created in Italy). The figures illustrated recall certain nudes in paintings by El Greco in their elongated proportions, but their naturalism and the accentuated musculature of the male figure are regarded by certain researchers as surprising for El Greco. Among the surviving El Greco works are four drawings; three of them preparatory works for the altarpiece of Santo Domingo el Antiguo and the fourth a study for one of his paintings, The Crucifixion.

== List of selected works ==
At the time of El Greco's death his belonging included 115 paintings, 15 sketches and 150 drawings. In 1908 Manuel B. Cossio, who regarded El Greco's style as a response to Spanish mysticism, published the first comprehensive catalogue of his works. In 1937 a highly influential study by art historian Rodolfo Pallucchini had the effect of greatly increasing the publicly accepted works of El Greco. Palluchini attributed to El Greco a small triptych in the Galleria Estense at Modena on the basis of a signature on the painting on the back of the central panel on the Modena triptych. There was consensus that the triptych was indeed an early work of El Greco and, therefore, Pallucchini's publication became the yardstick for attributions to the artist. As a result, about 119 disputed compositions (including 19 "signed") were attributed to El Greco. Nevertheless, this "over-production" of El Greco's works created a reaction by other scholars. Wethey denied that the Modena triptych had any connection with the artist and produced a reactive 1962 catalogue raisonné with a greatly reduced corpus of materials. Where art historian José Camón Aznar had attributed between 787 and 829 paintings to El Greco, Wethey reduced the number to 285 authentic works. Halldor Sœhner, a German researcher of Spanish art, recognized only 137. Both Wethey and Sœhner divided in their catalogues the works in those painted by El Greco and those produced by his workshop.

Since 1962 the discovery of the Dormition and the extensive archival research has gradually convinced scholarship that Wethey's assessments were not undisputed, and that his catalogue decisions may have distorted the whole nature of El Greco's origins, development and oeuvre. The discovery of the Dormition led to the attributions of other three signed works of "Doménicos" to El Greco (Modena Triptych, Saint Luke Painting the Virgin and Child and The Adoration of the Magi) and then to the acceptance as authentic of more works, some signed, some not, which were brought into the group of early works of El Greco. In 2006 another disputed work, The Passion of Christ — Pietà with Angels, has been finally attributed to El Greco. The painting had been photographed just before the signature was removed; Nano Chatzidakis, curator of the British Library exhibition and Professor of Byzantine Art and Archaeology at the University of Ioannina, unearthed the restorer's photograph.

Nowadays the number of El Greco's works is estimated at about 500. Nevertheless, certain disputes over the exact number of El Greco's authentic works remain unresolved, and the status of Wethey's (still highly esteemed) catalogue is at the centre of these disagreements. Quantitatively, the disagreements are mostly concerned with the end rather than the beginning of his career. It is clear his son continued to sell "El Grecos" for many years after the artist's death, and in his later years he had a large workshop who, as with other important artists of the period, produced repetitions of many of his compositions. The identification of these, and deciding how much involvement the master had, if any, in each case, remains unsettled.

These are some of El Greco's most important paintings:

=== Cretan period (b. 1567) ===
Image	Title	Date	Technique	Size (см)	Location	Note
	Adoration of the Magi	c.1565 — 1567	Wood, tempera and gold leaf	40 × 45	Benaki Museum, Athens	
	Adoration of the Magi	c. 1565 — 1567	Oil on canvas	45 × 52	Museum of Lazaro Galdiano, Madrid	
	Adoration of the Magi	c. 1565 — 1567	Oil on canvas		Museo Soumaya, Mexico City	
	Saint Luke Painting the Virgin and Child	c. 1567	Wood, tempera and gold leaf	41.6 × 33	Benaki Museum, Athens	
	Assumption of the Virgin	c. 1567	Wood, tempera and gold leaf	61.4 × 45	Cathedral of the Assumption, Ermoupolis	
	Christ Healing the Blind	1567	oil on canvas	65.5 × 84	Old Masters Gallery, Dresden	
	Modena Triptych	c. 1567–1569	Tempera on Wood	37 × 23.8; 24 × 18	Estense Gallery, Modena	

=== Italian period (1567–1577) ===
Image	Title	Date	Technique	Size (см)	Location	Note
	Saint Francis Receiving the Stigmata	c. 1567 – 1570	oil on wood	40.9 × 53.3	Accademia Carrara di Belle Arti di Bergamo, Bergamo	
	The Last Supper	1568 –1568	oil on wood	43 × 52	Pinacoteca Nazionale di Bologna, Bologna	
	Adoration of the Magi	c. 1569 — 1570	oil on canvas	63.5 × 76	Willumsens Museum, Frederikssund, Denmark	
	Purification of the Temple	c. 1570	oil on wood	64.5 × 83.2	National Gallery of Art, Washington, D.C.	
	Flight into Egypt	1570	oil on wood	15.9 × 21.6	Prado, Madrid	
	Annunciation	1570	oil on wood	26.7 × 20	Prado, Madrid	
	Adoration of the Shepherds	1570–1572	oil on canvas	114 × 104.5	private collection	
	Adoration of the Magi	1570	oil on canvas		San Diego Museum of Art	
	Saint Francis Receiving the Stigmata	1570	oil on canvas	28.8 × 20.6	Art Museum of the Paliard Foundation, Naples; Capodimonte Museum, Naples	
	Mount Sinai	c. 1570	oil on canvas	41 × 47.5	Historical Museum of Crete, Heraklion	
	Purification of the Temple	c. 1570	oil on canvas	116.8 × 149.8	Minneapolis Institute of Art, Minneapolis	
	The Fable	1570–1575	oil on wood	50.5 × 63.6	Prado, Madrid	
	The Entombment of Christ	1570–1576	oil on wood	51 × 43	National Art Gallery, Athens	
	Portrait of Giulio Clovio	c. 1571	oil on wood	58 × 86	Capodimonte Museum, Naples	
	Boy Blowing on an Ember to Light a Candle	1571–1572	oil on canvas	60.5 × 50.5	Capodimonte Museum, Naples	
	Portrait of Vincenzo Anastagi	1571–1576	oil on canvas	188 × 126.7	Frick Collection, New York	
	Pieta	1571–1576	Tempera on wood	28.9 × 20	Philadelphia Museum of Art, Philadelphia	
	Portrait of Charles de Guise	c. 1572	oil on canvas	178.5 × 94.5	Kunsthaus Zürich, Zürich, Switzerland	
	Christ on the Cross	1573	oil on canvas	43 × 28	Barbara Pyasetskaya-Johnson Collection, Princeton	
	Christ Healing the Blind	c. 1573	oil on canvas	50 × 61	Parma National Gallery, Parma, Italy	
	Annunciation	1575–1576	oil on canvas	117 × 98	Thyssen-Bornemisza Museum, Madrid	

- early 1570s Lamentation

=== Spanish period (1577–1614) ===
Image	Title	Date	Technique	Size (см)	Location	Note
	Holy Trinity	1577–1578	oil on canvas		Prado, Madrid	
	Portrait of a Sculptor	1576–1578	oil on canvas	94 × 87	private collection	
	The Penitent Mary Magdalene	1576–1578	oil on canvas	164 × 121	Museum of Fine Arts, Budapest	
	Saint Sebastian	1576–1579	oil on canvas	191 × 152	Palencia Cathedral, Palencia, Spain	
	Santo Domingo el Antiguo Altarpiece (9 paintings)	1577	oil on canvas		Monastery of Santo Domingo el Antiguo (3), Art Institute of Chicago (1), Prado (1)	
	Saint Lawrence's Vision of the Madonna and Child	1577	oil on canvas	119 × 102	College of Nosa Señora da Antiga, Monforte de Lemos, Spain	
	Adoration of the Holy Name of Jesus	1577–1579	oil on canvas	140 × 110	El Escorial, San Lorenzo de El Escorial, Spain	
	The Disrobing of Christ (El Espolio)	1577–1579	oil on canvas	285 × 173	Toledo Cathedral, Toledo, Spain	
	Saint Bernard	c. 1577 –1679	oil on canvas	116 × 79.5	Hermitage Museum, Saint Petersburg, Russia	
	Saint Francis of Assisi	1580	oil on canvas	138 × 56	Museum of Santa Cruz, Toledo, Spain	
	Saint Francis in Ecstasy	1580	oil on canvas	89 × 57	Lázaro Galdiano Museum, Madrid	
	Saint Anthony of Padua	1580	oil on canvas	104 × 79	Prado, Madrid	
	The Nobleman with his Hand on his Chest	c.1580	oil on canvas	81.8 × 65.8	Prado, Madrid	
	Christ Carrying the Cross	c.1580	oil on canvas	105 × 79	Metropolitan Museum of Art, New York	
	The Martyrdom of Saint Maurice	1580–1582	oil on canvas	445 × 294	El Escorial, San Lorenzo de El Escorial, Spain	
	The Tears of Saint Peter	c.1580 – 1589	oil on canvas	109 × 90	Bowes Museum, Co Durham, England	
	Portrait of a Doctor	1582–1585	oil on canvas	95 × 82	Prado, Madrid	
	Saint Francis Receiving the Stigmata	1585–1590	oil on canvas	97 × 102	Walters Art Museum, Baltimore, Maryland	
	The Immaculate Conception with Saint John the Evangelist	c.1585	oil on canvas	237 × 118	Museum of Santa Cruz, Toledo, Spain	
	The Burial of the Count of Orgaz	1586	oil on canvas	480 × 360	Church of Santo Tomé, Toledo, Spain	
	Portrait of a Gentleman	c.1586	oil on canvas	67 × 55	Prado, Madrid	
	Holy Family	1586–1588	oil on canvas	178 × 105	Museum of Santa Cruz, Toledo, Spain	
	Holy Face of Jesus (The Veil of Saint Veronica)	1586–1595	oil on canvas	71 × 54	Prado, Madrid	
	Saint Peter and Saint Paul	1587–1592	oil on canvas	121.5 × 105	Hermitage Museum, St Petersburg, Russia	
	The Tears of Saint Peter	c.1587 – 1596	oil on canvas	96.5 × 79	Museo Soumaya, Mexico City	
	Portrait of Rodrigo Vázquez de Arce	1587–1597	oil on canvas	62.5 × 42	Prado, Madrid	
	Portrait of an Elderly Man	1587–1600	oil on canvas	46 × 43	Prado, Madrid	
	Agony in the Garden	1590	oil on canvas	103 × 131	National Gallery, London	
	Christ on the Cross with two Donors	c.1590	oil on canvas	260 × 171	Louvre Museum, Paris	
	The Tears of Saint Peter	c.1590	oil on canvas	102 × 79.5	National Museum of Art, Architecture and Design, Oslo	
	Christ Carrying the Cross	1590–1595	oil on canvas	106 × 69	National Museum of Art of Catalonia, Barcelona	
	Apostles Peter and Paul	1590–1600	oil on canvas	116 × 91.8	National Museum of Art of Catalonia, Barcelona	
	Saint Louis IX with a Page	1592–1595	oil on canvas	120 × 96	Louvre Museum, Paris	
	Virgin Mary	c.1594 – 1604	oil on canvas	53 × 37	Musée des Beaux-Arts de Strasbourg, Strasbourg, France	
	Saint Francis Receiving the Stigmata	Before 1595	oil on canvas	76 × 55.6	Musée des Beaux-Arts de Pau, France	
	Holy Family with Saint Anne	c.1595	oil on canvas	127 × 106	Hospital of Tavera, Toledo, Spain	
	Saint Andrew and Saint Francis	1595–1598	oil on canvas	167 × 113	Prado, Madrid	
	Portrait of Antonio de Covarrubias	1595–1600	oil on canvas	65 × 52	Louvre Museum, Paris	
	Portrait of an Old Man (so called self-portrait)	1595–1600	oil on canvas	52.7 × 46.7	Metropolitan Museum of Art, New York	
	Purification of the Temple	1595–1600	oil on canvas	41.9 × 52.4	Frick Collection, New York	
	View of Toledo	1596–1600	oil on canvas	121.3 × 108.6	Metropolitan Museum of Art, New York	
	Doña María de Aragón Altarpiece (7 paintings- Resurrection, Crucifixion, Pentecost, Adoration of Shepherds, Annunciation, Baptism of Christ, Lost work)	1596–1599	oil on canvas	various	Prado, Madrid (5), National Museum of Art of Romania, Bucharest (1), Lost (1)	
	Allegory of the Camaldolese Order	1597	oil on canvas	138 × 108	Museo del Patriarca, Valencia, Spain	
	Virgin Mary	1597	oil on canvas	52 × 41	Prado, Madrid	
	Saint Joseph and the Christ Child	1597–1599	oil on canvas	289 × 147	Toledo Cathedral, Toledo, Spain	
	Saint Martin and the Beggar	c.1597 – 1599	oil on canvas	193.5 × 103	National Gallery of Art, Washington, D.C.	
	Christ Carrying the Cross	1597–1600	oil on canvas	108 × 78	Prado, Madrid	
	Portrait of Jorge Manuel Theotokopoulos	1597–1603	oil on canvas	81 × 56	Museum of Fine Arts of Seville, Seville	
	Saint Ildefonsus	1597–1603	oil on canvas	187 × 102	Capilla Mayor del Hospital de la Caridad de Illescas, Toledo, Spain	
	Saint Augustine	1597–1603	oil on canvas	140 × 56	Museum of Santa Cruz, Toledo, Spain	
	Saint John the Baptist	1597–1603	oil on canvas	111 × 66	Fine Arts Museums of San Francisco	
	The Virgin of Charity	1597–1603	oil on canvas	184 × 124	Capilla Mayor del Hospital de la Caridad de Illescas, Toledo, Spain	
	Agony in the Garden	1597–1607	oil on canvas	169 × 112	Santa Maria la Mayor, Andujar, Spain	
	Annunciation	1600	oil on canvas	107 × 74	São Paulo Museum of Art, São Paulo	
	Purification of the Temple	1600	oil on canvas	106 × 130	National Gallery, London	
	Allegory of the Camaldolese Order	c.1600	oil on wood	124 × 90	Instituto Valencia of Don Juan, Madrid	
	Portrait of Diego de Covarrubias y Leyva	c.1600	oil on wood	68 × 57	El Greco Museum, Toledo, Toledo, Spain	
	Portrait of a Cardinal (possibly Fernando Niño de Guevara)	c.1600	oil on canvas	67.2 × 42.5	Metropolitan Museum of Art, New York	
	Saint John the Evangelist and Saint Francis	c.1600	oil on canvas	110 × 86	Uffizi, Florence	
	Portrait of a Young Nobleman	1600–1605	oil on canvas	65 × 49	Prado, Madrid	
	Saint John the Baptist	1600–1605	oil on canvas	103 × 62	Museu de Belles Arts de València, Valencia, Spain	
	Annunciation	1600–1605	oil on canvas	128 diameter	Capilla Mayor del Hospital de la Caridad de Illescas, Toledo, Spain	
	Saint John the Baptist and Saint John the Evangelist	1600–1610	oil on canvas	110 × 86	Prado, Madrid	
	Christ (Toledo series)	c.1602 – 1607	oil on canvas	98 × 78	Toledo Cathedral, Toledo, Spain	
	Saint Luke (Toledo series)	1602–1605	oil on canvas	100 × 76	Toledo Cathedral, Toledo, Spain	
	Saint James the Less (Toledo series)	1602–1607	oil on canvas	98 × 78	Toledo Cathedral, Toledo, Spain	
	Saint Peter (Toledo series)	1602–1607	oil on canvas	98 × 78	Toledo Cathedral, Toledo, Spain	
	Saint Andrew (Toledo series)	1602–1607	oil on canvas	98 × 78	Toledo Cathedral, Toledo, Spain	
	Saint Matthew (Toledo series)	1602–1607	oil on canvas	98 × 78	Toledo Cathedral, Toledo, Spain	
	Saint Thaddeus (Saint Jude) (Toledo series)	1602–1607	oil on canvas	98 × 78	Toledo Cathedral, Toledo, Spain	
	Saint Bernardino of Siena	1603	oil on canvas	269 × 144	El Greco Museum, Toledo, (Toledo, Spain) (Property of Prado, Madrid)	
	Coronation of the Virgin	1603–1605	oil on canvas	163 × 220	Capilla Mayor del Hospital de la Caridad de Illescas, Toledo, Spain	
	Nativity	1603–1605	oil on canvas	128 diameter	Capilla Mayor del Hospital de la Caridad de Illescas, Toledo, Spain	
	Marriage of the Virgin	1603–1607	oil on canvas	110 × 83	National Museum of Art of Romania, Bucharest	
	Portrait of an Unknown Gentleman	1603–1607	oil on canvas	64 × 51	Prado, Madrid	
	The Apparition of the Virgin to Saint Hyacinth	c. 1605–1610	oil on canvas	100 × 61.9	Memorial Art Gallery, Rochester, New York	
	The Apparition of the Virgin to Saint Hyacinth	c. 1605–1610	oil on canvas	158.4 x 98.7	Barnes Foundation, Philadelphia, Pennsylvania	
	Immaculate Conception	1607–1613	oil on canvas	348 × 174.5	Museum of Santa Cruz, Toledo, Spain	
	Concert of Angels	1608	oil on canvas	112 × 205	National Gallery, Athens	
	Saint Peter	1608	oil on canvas	207 × 105	El Escorial, San Lorenzo de El Escorial, Spain	
	View and Plan of Toledo	c.1608	oil on canvas	132 × 228	El Greco Museum, Toledo, Toledo, Spain	
	Baptism of Christ	1608–1614	oil on canvas	330 × 221	Tavera Hospital, Toledo, Spain	
	The Saviour (Almadrones series)	1608–1614	oil on canvas	72 × 55	Prado, Madrid	
	Saint Thomas the Apostle (Almadrones series)	1608–1614	oil on canvas	72 × 55	Prado, Madrid	
	Saint James the Elder (Almadrones series)	1608–1614	oil on canvas	72 × 55	Prado, Madrid	
	Opening of the Fifth Seal (The Fifth Seal of the Apocalypse, The Vision of Saint John)	1608–1614	oil on canvas	224.8 × 199.4	Metropolitan Museum of Art, New York	
	Annunciation	1609	oil on canvas	294 × 204	private collection, Madrid	
	Portrait of Fray Hortensio Félix Paravacino	1609	oil on canvas	112.1 × 86.1	Museum of Fine Arts, Boston	
	Portrait of Cardinal Tavera	1609	oil on canvas	103 × 82	Tavera Hospital, Toledo, Spain	
	Saint Jerome	1609	oil on canvas	108 × 87	Metropolitan Museum of Art, New York	
	Saint Ildefonsus	1609	oil on canvas	222 × 105	El Escorial, Spain	
	Saint John the Evangelist	1609	oil on canvas	90 × 77	Prado, Madrid	
	Saint Francis and Brother Leo	1609	oil on canvas	155 × 100	College of Nosa Señora da Antiga, Monforte de Lemos	
	Purification of the Temple	1609	oil on canvas	106 × 104	San Ginés, Madrid	
	Portrait of Jerónimo de Cevallos	1609–1613	oil on canvas	65 × 55	Prado, Madrid	
	Visitation	1609–1613	oil on canvas	98 × 72	Dumbarton Oaks, Washington, D.C.	
	Laocoön	1610–1614	oil on canvas	142 × 193	National Gallery of Art, Washington, D.C.	
	Portrait of Francisco de Pisa	1610–1614	oil on canvas	107 × 90	Kimbell Art Museum, Fort Worth	
	Saint Luke (Almadrones series)	1610–1614	oil on canvas	72 × 59	Indianapolis Museum of Art, Indianapolis	
	Saint Matthew (Almadrones series)	c. 1610 – 1614	oil on canvas	72 × 59	Indianapolis Museum of Art, Indianapolis	
	Saint Simon (Almadrones series)	c. 1610 – 1614	oil on canvas	72 × 59	Indianapolis Museum of Art, Indianapolis	
	Saint Paul (Almadrones series)	c. 1610 – 1614	oil on canvas	72 × 55	Prado, Madrid	
	Saint Andrew (Almadrones series)	c. 1610 – 1614	oil on canvas	72 × 55	Los Angeles County Museum of Art, Los Angeles	
	Saint John the Evangelist (Almadrones series)		oil on canvas		Kimbell Art Museum, Fort Worth, Texas	
	Saint Sebastian	c.1610 – 1614	oil on canvas	201.5 × 111.5	Prado, Madrid	
	Apostolado (El Greco museum) (13 paintings)	1610–1614	oil on canvas	all 97 × 77	El Greco Museum, Toledo, Toledo, Spain	
	Christ on the Cross with a View of Toledo	1610–1614	oil on canvas	104.1 × 61.9	Cincinnati Art Museum, Cincinnati	
	Adoration of the Shepherds	1612–1614	oil on canvas	319 × 180	Prado, Madrid	
	Julián Romero and Saint Julian	1612–1614	oil on canvas	206.7 × 127.5	Prado, Madrid	
	Annunciation	1614	oil on canvas	152 × 99	Diocese Museum, Sigüenza	

- c. 1582–1586 Saint Mary Magdalene
- c. 1585–1588 Portrait of Rodrigo de la Fuente
- c. 1590–1595 Agony in the Garden – several versions, the one in Toledo, Ohio being accepted as prime.
- c. 1597–1599 Madonna and the Child with Saint Martina and Saint Agnes
- c. 1600–1605 The Repentant Saint Peter, Phillips Collection
- c. 1600–1610 Saint Jerome as Cardinal – five versions, those in the Frick and Metropolitan being generally accepted as prime. Also Madrid, London.
- c. 1603–1605 Coronation of the Virgin, Royal Monastery of Guadalupe (Spain).
- c. 1607 Saint Mary Magdalene

== See also ==
- Museum of El Greco
