= Portrait of an Elderly Man =

Painting by El Greco

- Retrato de caballero anciano (Spanish)
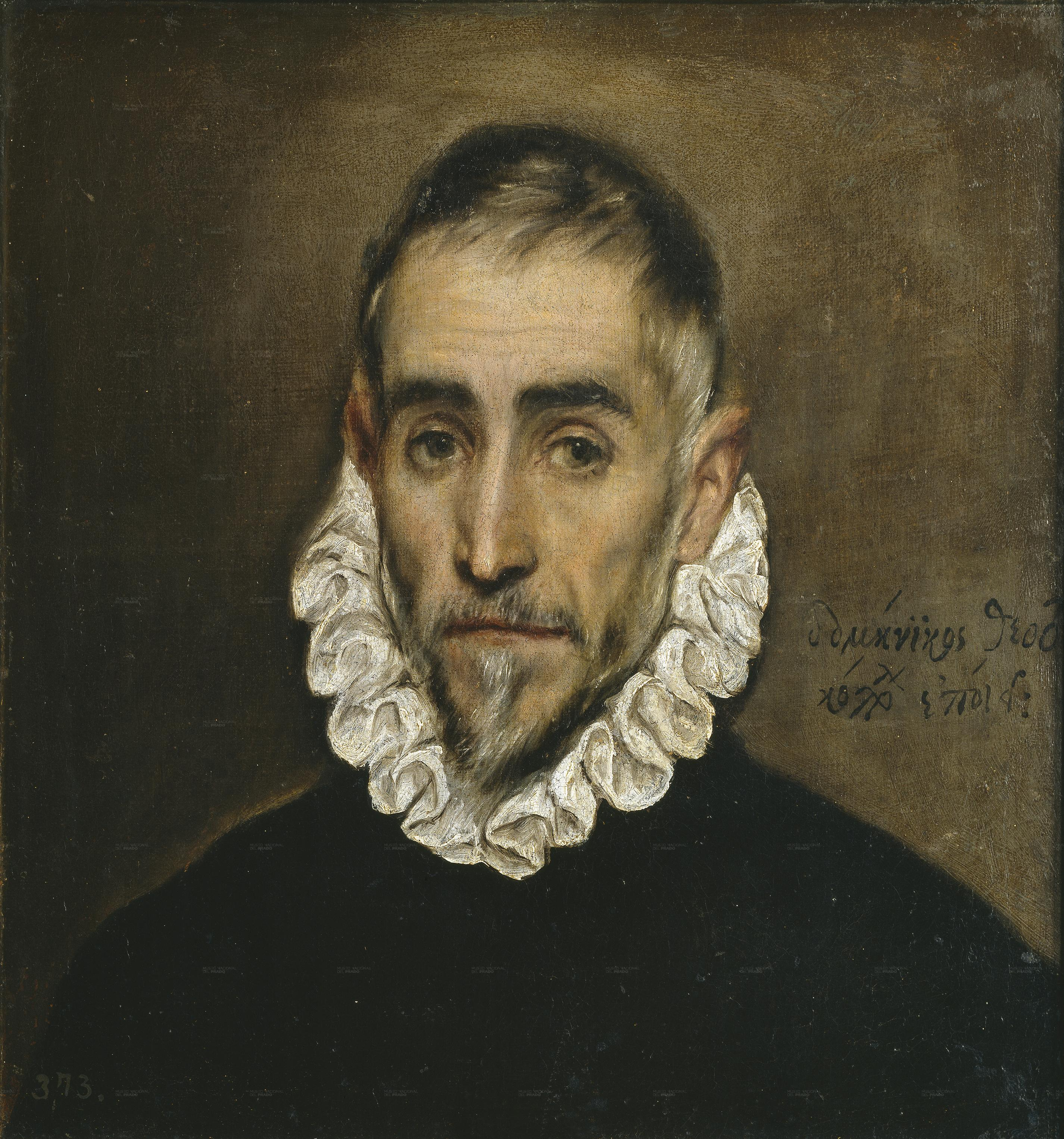
- Artist: El Greco
- Year: 1587–1600
- Medium: Oil on canvas
- Dimensions: 46 cm × 43 cm (18 in × 17 in)
- Location: Museo del Prado, Madrid

Portrait of an Elderly Man or Portrait of an Old Nobleman (Spanish: Retrato de caballero anciano) is a 1587–1600 oil on canvas portrait by El Greco, now in the Museo del Prado. Its subject's name is unknown but he probably came from Toledo, where the artist was then working. It was stored in the basement of the Real Alcázar of Madrid. The painting is signed in Greek characters "domenikos theoto: / kopol´´epoiei" on the right margin above the shoulder.

== Critical reception ==
Art critic Bartolomé Cossío praised the work in his 1908 catalog, stating: "It is difficult to find among all of El Greco's portraits a piece superior to this head, due to the severe precision of execution and the supreme simplicity of background and form."

== Copies ==
A watercolor study was made by Spanish artist Ricardo de Madrazo y Garreta in 1873. The 132 by 118 millimetres (5.2 in × 4.6 in) work on cardboard is dedicated "A mi querido Martin Rico" and signed "Ricardo Madrazo / Roma 1873".

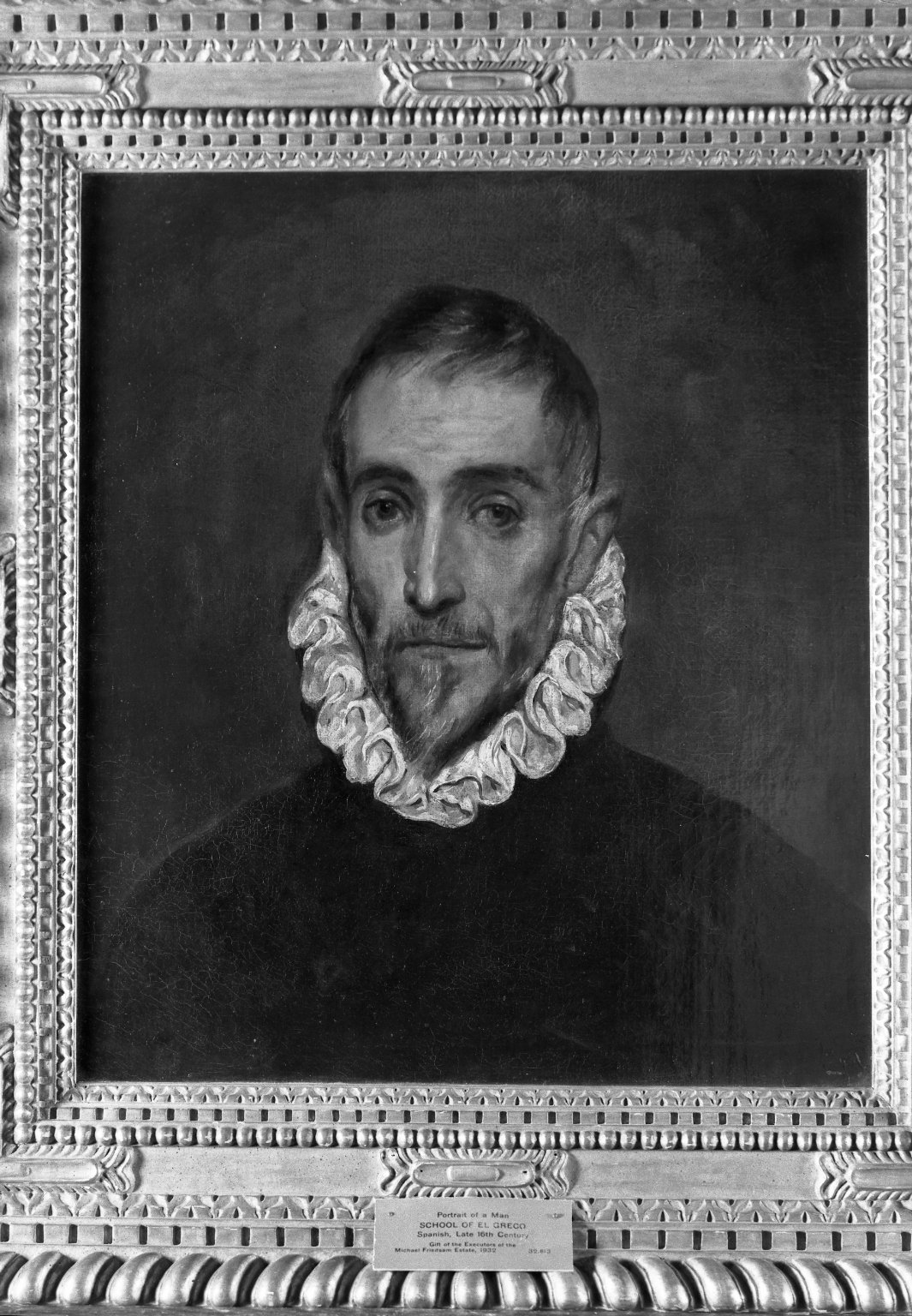
The Brooklyn Museum's forgery (accession no. 32.813), now attributed "After El Greco"

A forgery is held by the Brooklyn Museum as part of the Michael Friedsam bequest, and is now attributed "After El Greco". X-ray examination revealed that the work was painted over a cut-down piece of genuinely old canvas; the paint is modern, dissolves easily, and shows no proper age cracks under microscopic analysis. The museum cannot deaccession the painting due to bequest restrictions.

== See also ==
- List of works by El Greco
