= Saint Louis (El Greco) =

Painting by El Greco

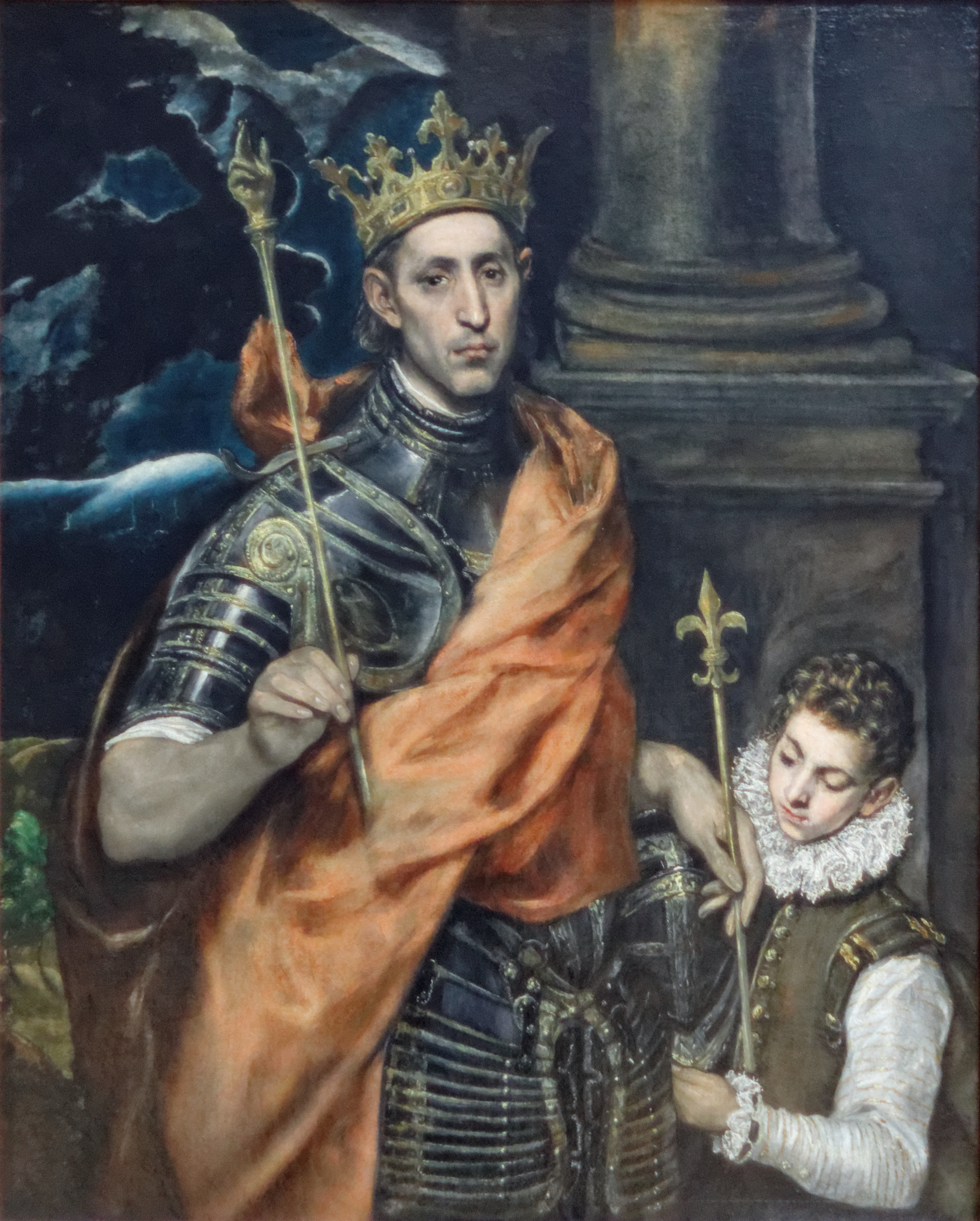
- Artist: El Greco
- Year: 1592–1595
- Medium: oil on canvas
- Dimensions: 120 cm × 96 cm (47 in × 38 in)
- Location: Louvre, Paris

Saint Louis is a 1592–1595 painting by El Greco, painted during his time in Toledo. It is now in the Louvre in Paris.

It shows Louis IX of France wearing 16th-century armour and a crown and holding his family symbol of a fleur de lys and the traditional sceptre of the kings of France. Gregorio Marañon and Manuel Bartolomé Cossío argue the model was a patient at the Hospital del Nuncio or an old print.

Louis was the grandson of Alfonso VIII of Castile, meaning that in the late 16th century, he was revered in both France and Spain, particularly since no Spanish king was canonised until Ferdinand III of Castile received the honour in 1671. The work was commissioned by Luis de Castilla, the painter's friend and future executor – the saint was also Luis' name saint. For a period the work was in the collection of the château de Chenonceau, before being acquired by its present owner in 1903. A recent restoration has revealed a cityscape in the background, showing Toledo.

== See also ==
- List of works by El Greco

== Bibliography ==
- (in Spanish) ÁLVAREZ LOPERA, José, El Greco, Madrid, Arlanza, 2005, Biblioteca «Descubrir el Arte», (colección «Grandes maestros»). ISBN 84-9550-344-1.
- (in Spanish) SCHOLZ-HÄNSEL, Michael, El Greco, Colonia, Taschen, 2003. ISBN 978-3-8228-3173-1.
