= Portrait of a Young Nobleman =

Painting by El Greco

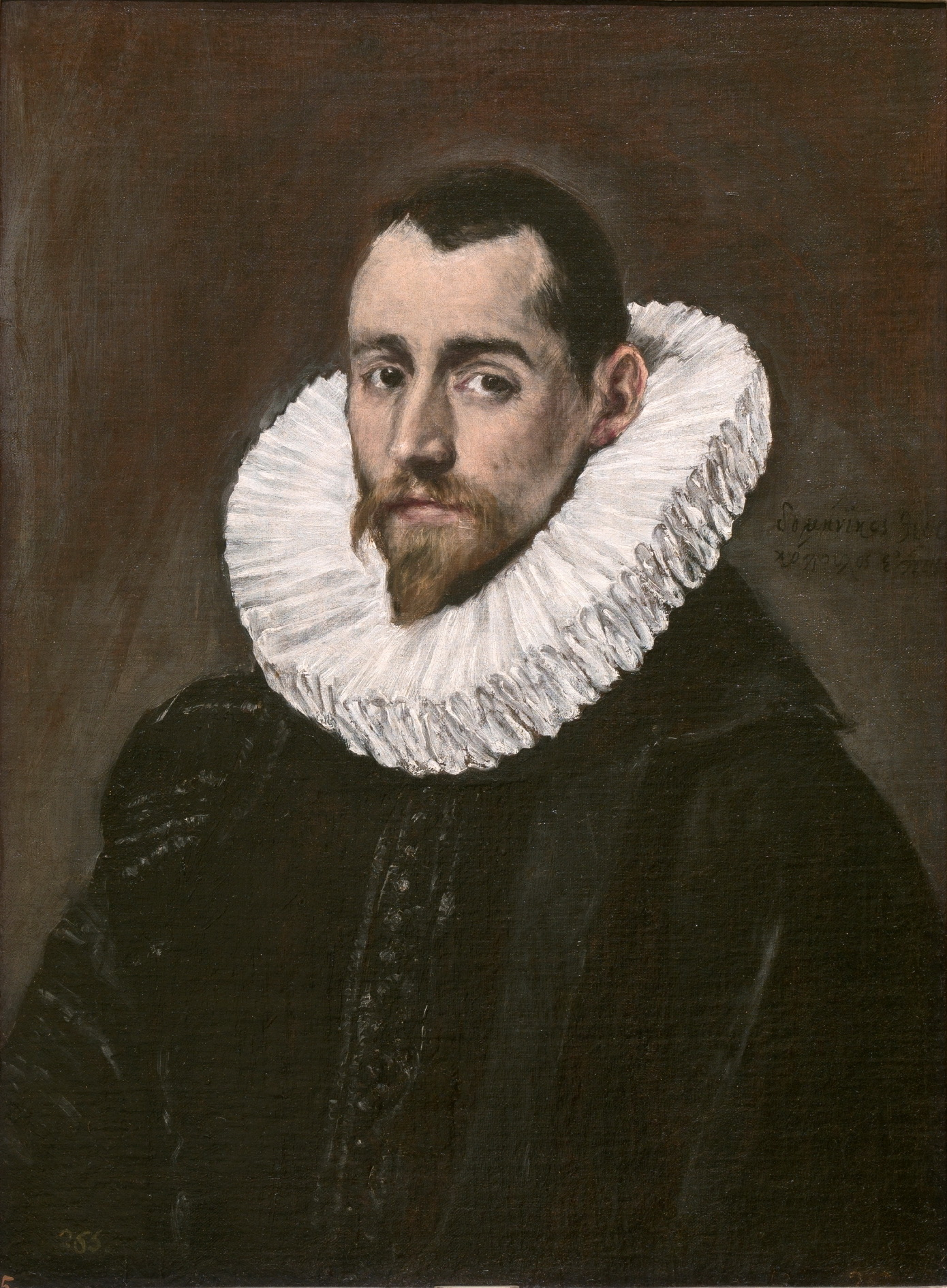
- Artist: El Greco
- Year: 1600-1605
- Medium: oil on canvas
- Dimensions: 65 cm × 49 cm (26 in × 19 in)
- Location: Museo del Prado, Madrid

Portrait of a Young Nobleman (Spanish - Retrato de caballero joven) is a 1600–1605 oil on canvas portrait by El Greco, originally in the quinta del Duque del Arco at the Royal Palace of El Pardo in Madrid but now in the Museo del Prado. It was long thought to show the poet Baltasar Elisio de Medinilla, but this has been disproven, and its subject is now unknown. It appears to have been influenced by portraits by Titian and Tintoretto, who El Greco knew whilst in Venice.

== See also ==
- List of works by El Greco

== Bibliography ==
- (in Spanish) ÁLVAREZ LOPERA, José, El Greco, Madrid, Arlanza, 2005, Biblioteca «Descubrir el Arte», (colección «Grandes maestros»). ISBN 84-95503-44-1.
- SCHOLZ-HÄNSEL, Michael, El Greco, Colonia, Taschen, 2003. ISBN 978-3-8228-3173-1.
