= Annunciation (El Greco, Museo Thyssen-Bornemisza) =

Painting by El Greco

The Annunciation
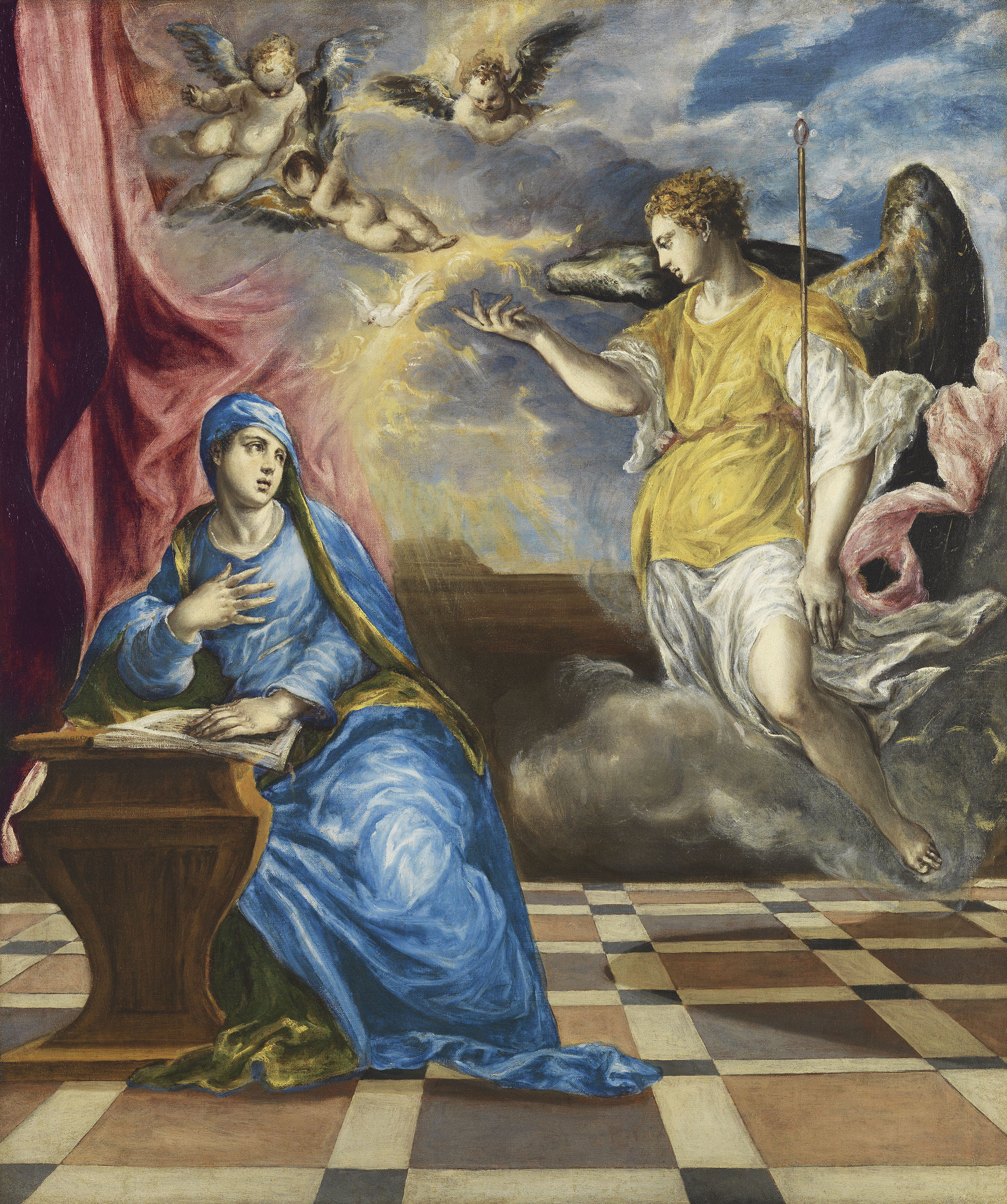
- Artist: El Greco
- Year: 1575–1576
- Medium: oil on canvas
- Dimensions: 117 cm × 98 cm (46 in × 39 in)
- Location: Thyssen-Bornemisza Museum, Madrid

The Annunciation is a 1575–1576 oil painting on canvas by the Greek artist of the Spanish Renaissance El Greco. It is one of the earliest paintings by the artist and depicts the Annunciation, a key topic in Christian art. The painting is now in the Thyssen-Bornemisza Museum, in Madrid.

== See also ==
- List of works by El Greco

== Bibliography ==
- (in Spanish) José Álvarez Lopera, El Greco, Madrid, Arlanza, 2005, Biblioteca «Descubrir el Arte», (colección «Grandes maestros»). ISBN 84-95503-44-1.
- (in Spanish) Michael Scholz-Hänsel, El Greco, Colonia, Taschen, 2003. ISBN 3-8228-3173-5.
