= Agony in the Garden (El Greco, London) =

1590 painting by El Greco

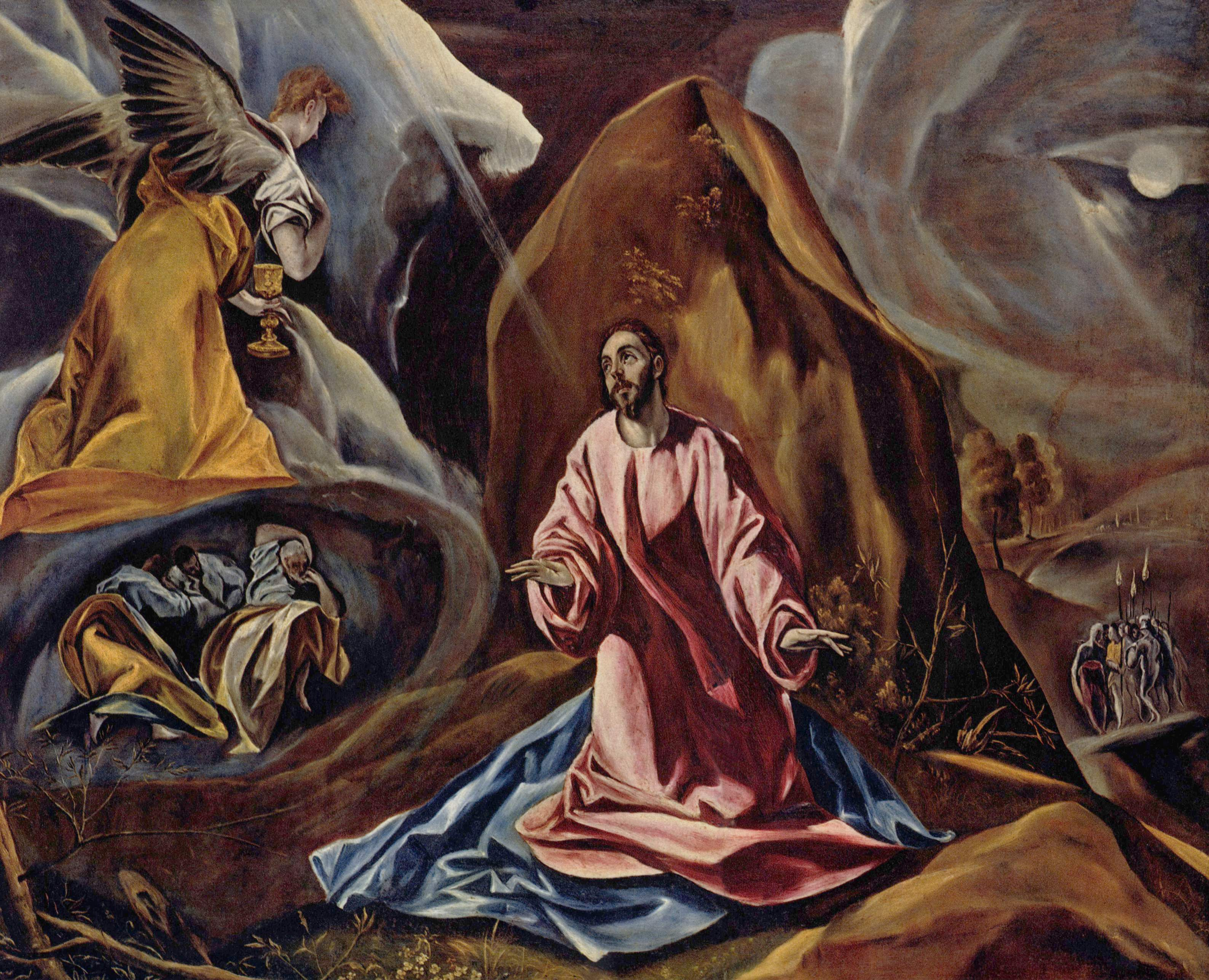
- Artist: Studio of El Greco
- Year: 1590s
- Medium: oil on canvas
- Dimensions: 102 cm × 131 cm (40 in × 52 in)
- Location: National Gallery, London

Agony in the Garden is a 1590s oil on canvas painting from the studio of El Greco after an original in Toledo Museum of Art, Ohio. Dating to his second stay in Toledo and still showing the major influence of Titian on his work, it is now in the collection the National Gallery in London.

An angel appears to Christ in the left foreground, holding a chalice in his hand. In the right-hand background, Judas and a group of soldiers approach to arrest Christ, marching through a dry landscape without vegetation. The painting is named after the Agony in the Garden of Gethsemane, which was an event in Jesus' life leading up to his crucifixion.

== See also ==
- List of works by El Greco

== Bibliography ==
- (in Spanish) ÁLVAREZ LOPERA, José, El Greco, Madrid, Arlanza, 2005, Biblioteca «Descubrir el Arte», (colección «Grandes maestros»). ISBN 84-95503-44-1.
- (in Spanish) SCHOLZ-HÄNSEL, Michael, El Greco, Colonia, Taschen, 2003. ISBN 978-3-8228-3173-1.
