= The Flight into Egypt (El Greco) =

Painting by El Greco

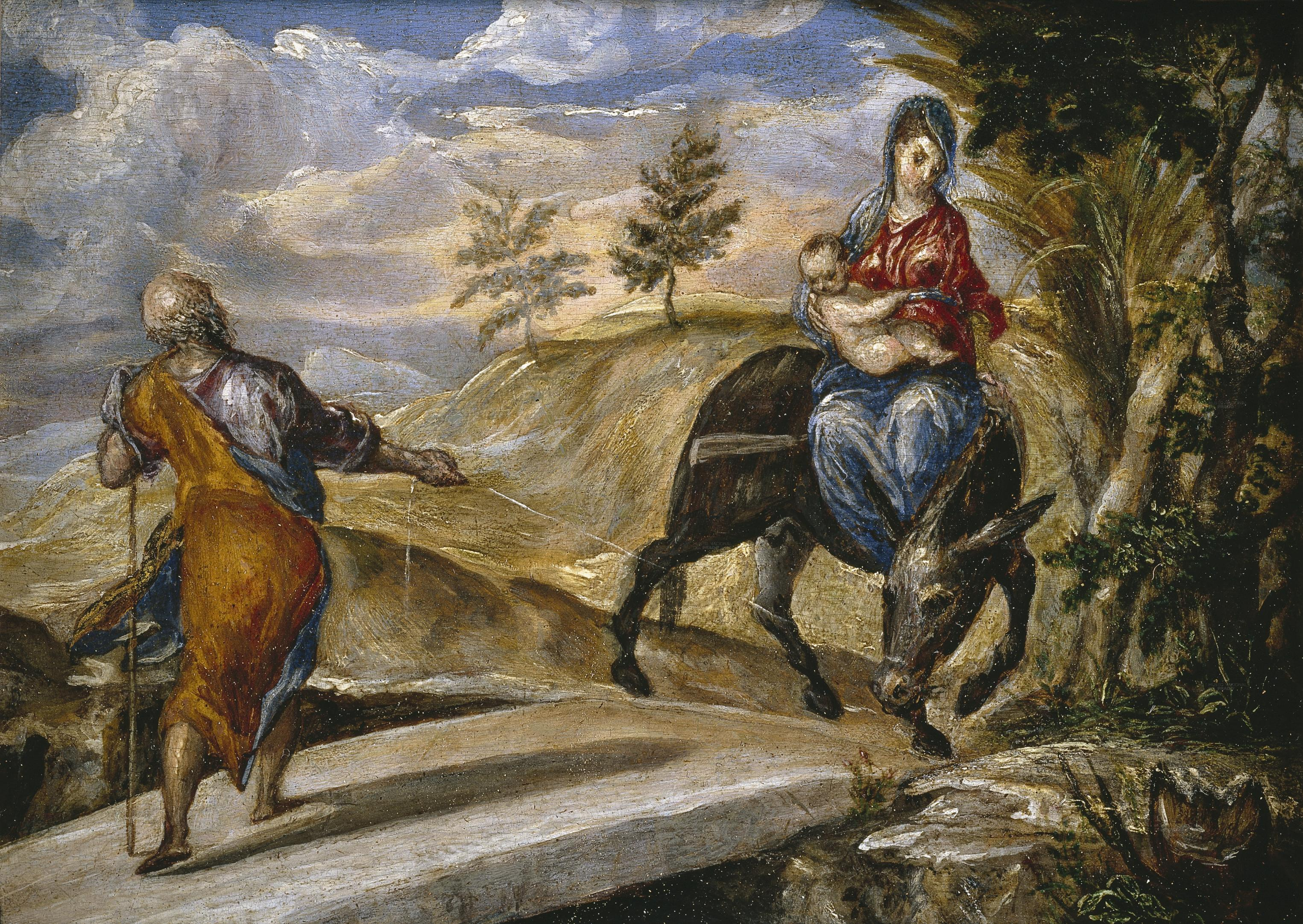
- Artist: El Greco
- Year: c.1570
- Medium: oil on panel
- Dimensions: 15.9 cm × 21.6 cm (6.3 in × 8.5 in)
- Location: Museo del Prado, Madrid

The Flight into Egypt is a c.1570 painting of the Flight into Egypt by El Greco, now in the Museo del Prado in Madrid. It is one of his earliest works, dating to his stay in Venice, and shows the major influence of Tintoretto and Jacopo Bassano, especially in the landscape background. The clouds and the chromaticism are similar to his Healing of the Man Born Blind, though most of the tonalities show the influence of Raphael and Michelangelo.

== See also ==
- List of works by El Greco

== Bibliography (in Spanish) ==
- ÁLVAREZ LOPERA, José, El Greco, Madrid, Arlanza, 2005, Biblioteca «Descubrir el Arte», (colección «Grandes maestros»). ISBN 84-9550-344-1.
- SCHOLZ-HÄNSEL, Michael, El Greco, Colonia, Taschen, 2003. ISBN 978-3-8228-3173-1.
- http://www.museodelprado.es/coleccion/galeria-on-line/galeria-on-line/obra/la-huida-a-egipto/
- http://www.museodelprado.es/enciclopedia/enciclopedia-on-line/voz/huida-a-egipto-la-el-greco/
