= Pietà (El Greco) =

Painting by El Greco

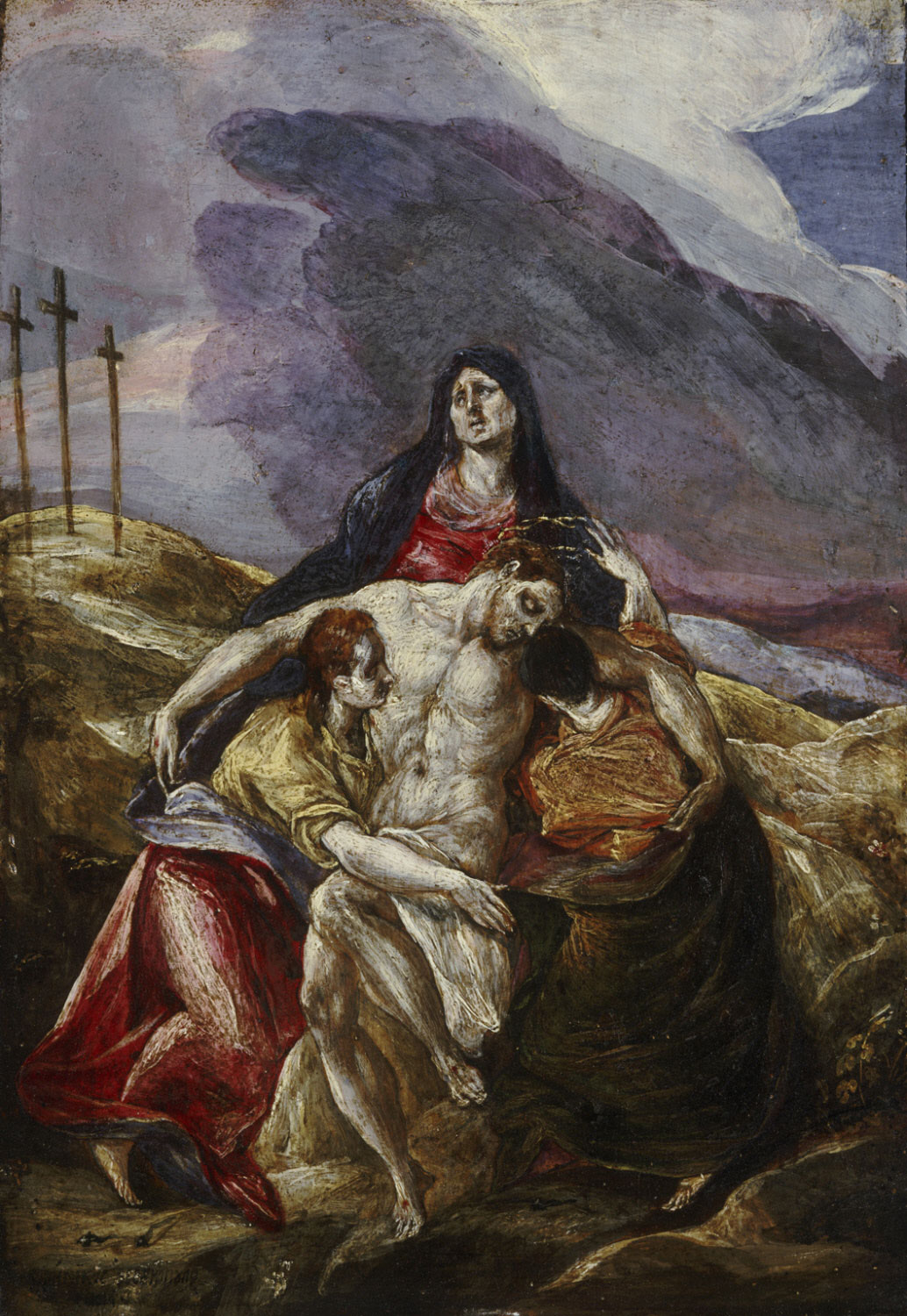
- Artist: El Greco
- Year: 1571-1576
- Medium: tempera on panel
- Dimensions: 28.9 cm × 20 cm (11.4 in × 7.9 in)
- Location: Hispanic Society Museum & Library

Pietà is a 1571-1576 painting by El Greco, produced just after his arrival in Rome and with clear influence from Michelangelo, although the triangular composition is El Greco's own invention. In the background is a landscape scene. It is now in the Hispanic Society of America.

== See also ==
- List of works by El Greco

== Bibliography ==
- (in Spanish) ÁLVAREZ LOPERA, José, El Greco, Madrid, Arlanza, 2005, Biblioteca «Descubrir el Arte», (colección «Grandes maestros»). ISBN 84-9550-344-1.
- (in Spanish) SCHOLZ-HÄNSEL, Michael, El Greco, Colonia, Taschen, 2003. ISBN 978-3-8228-3173-1.
