= The Immaculate Conception with Saint John the Evangelist =

Painting by El Greco

- The Virgin of the Immaculate Conception and Saint John the Evangelist (English), La Inmaculada Concepción vista por San Juan Evangelista (Spanish)
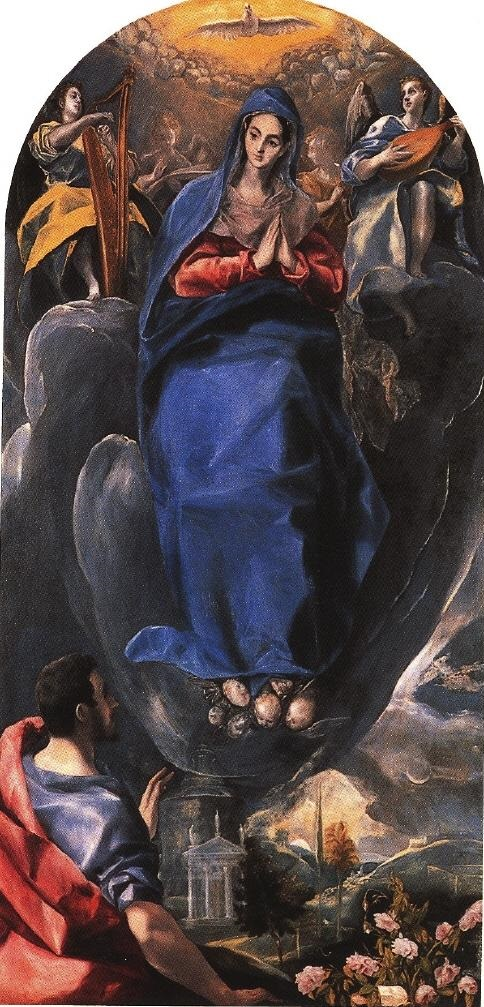
- Artist: El Greco
- Year: c. 1585
- Medium: Oil on canvas
- Dimensions: 237 cm × 118 cm (93 in × 46 in)
- Location: Museum of Santa Cruz, Toledo, Spain

The Immaculate Conception with Saint John the Evangelist is an oil painting on canvas of c. 1585 by El Greco, depicting the Virgin of the Immaculate Conception with Saint John the Evangelist.

== Background ==
El Greco immersed himself in the Italian Renaissance, allowing him to experiment with the opposing colore and disegno techniques for size (during his stay in Venice and Rome). El Greco relocated to Toledo in 1577. This move signified the beginning of his vital role in the Spanish Renaissance movement. In Italy he left behind a circle of like-minded individuals, mostly scholars and fellow artists, who shared the belief or understanding that a virtuoso, or true artist, was one who surpassed basic craftsmanship into the realm of artistic imagination. This conception of the role of artists in Italy was not echoed in Toledo. El Greco hoped to become a reputed and well-represented artist in Spain if he could be recognized by King Philip II. Such patronage would ensure a secure transition into the Spanish Empire, as well as prospective migration to a metropolis like Madrid. However, following a string of legal disputes over what El Greco deemed inadequate pay for his work, along with his decision to prioritize showcasing his own stylistic choices over a straightforward and naturalistic depiction of religious content, the Cretan master achieved just the opposite.

Consequently, El Greco remained in Toledo for the rest of his life, where he was well-received by his contemporaries such as the Spanish preacher and poet Hortensio Félix Paravicino, who remarked that "Crete gave him life and the painter's craft, Toledo a better homeland, where through death he began to achieve eternal life". Other than the appreciation shown towards El Greco by his contemporaries, he also found success in his artistic career. Between 1581 and 1585, the demand for devotional works escalated rapidly. His customers could choose from a few samples, often smaller versions of his works, which he then altered to their preferences.

El Greco later became the master of a workshop which dealt with the creation of architectural and framing devices for cathedrals. His paintings were likely to be commissioned for the same veneration-oriented establishments. El Greco and his workshop had a profitable decade between 1597 and 1607, and during that time yielded several commissions and outputs. During this time, significant projects elevated El Greco's career and reputation, which met his ambitions, despite his staying in Toledo.

== Analysis ==
The work's overarching theme is one that had been extensively developed by El Greco over a couple decades of his career. This canvas essentially served as a predecessor to his later Immaculate Conception. In the earlier work, El Greco defies the conventional Western pictorial composition; instead of causing the viewer's glance to travel from right to left, as was the usual line of sight, Saint John is positioned in the bottom-left corner of the painting, struck by the vision of the Madonna floating above him. In this way, El Greco's unorthodox composition becomes a consciously chosen visual device: the viewer becomes incorporated into the painting by being placed in the shoes of Saint John. Notably, even in this early ideological stage for the theology in relation to the Virgin Mary, Saint John, with his back to the viewer, surrenders the spotlight to the mother of Christ. Yet, with a minor role in the painting, the saint's inclusion contributes to a metaphorical representation of the doctrine of the Immaculate Conception; his vision at Patmos during which the Virgin Mary is conceived, by the grace of God, without the sin of humanity.

The painting's angular and schematic quality reflects El Greco's constant ties to his Byzantine roots. A mandorla conveys the quality of a halo as it frames Mary's head, and the beaming rays of sunlight are a common motif seen in the artist's works. El Greco implements symbolism with the depiction of roses, iris, olive, and palm, as well as the throne implied by the cherub heads that framed Mary's feet (also seen in The Holy Trinity, 1577–1579). In the same detail of the Virgin, one can make out a crescent moon which contributes to Mary's unspoiled birth, additionally acting as a cultural insight into Spanish Catholicism. During the Spanish Renaissance, the Virgin Mary had a widespread cult which attributed the crescent moon to the divine figure. The thornless roses allude to a part of nature which is often used to reflect the relations between God and Christ, one that has no imperfections. The enclosed garden alludes to the concept of the Virgin as a hortus conclusus, which refers to her virtue and purity.

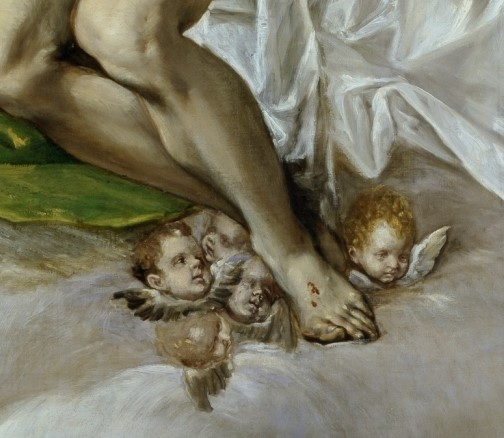
Detail of Cherub heads at the feet in The Holy Trinity (1577–1579)

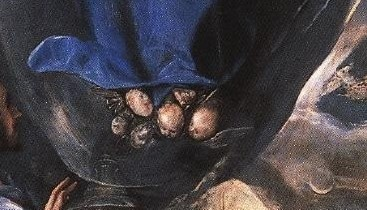
Detail of Cherub heads at the Virgin's feet in The Immaculate Conception with Saint John the Evangelist

== See also ==
- List of works by El Greco
