= Saint Andrew and Saint Francis =

Painting by El Greco

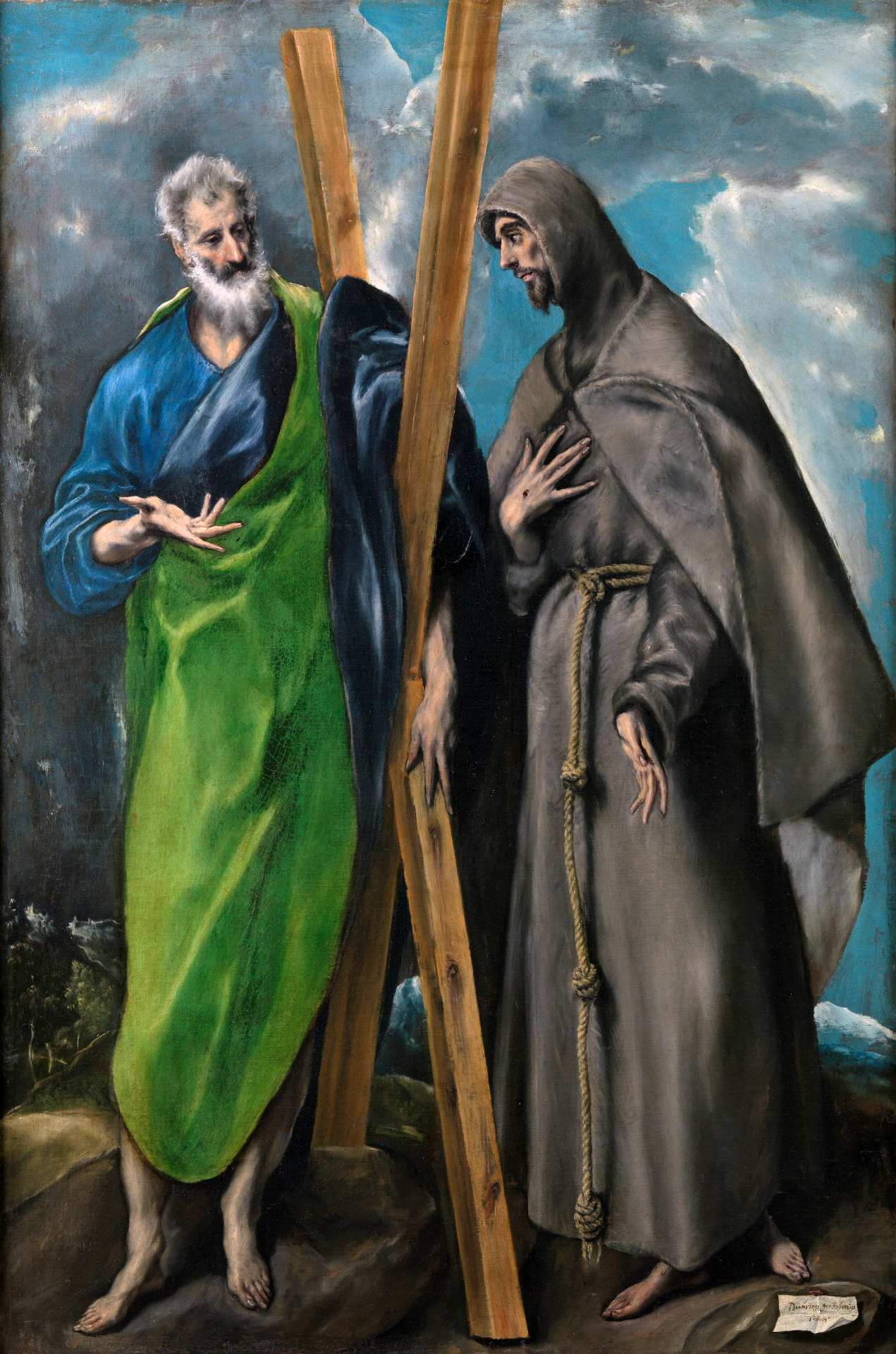
- Artist: El Greco
- Year: 1595-1598
- Medium: oil on canvas
- Dimensions: 167 cm × 113 cm (66 in × 44 in)
- Location: Prado, Madrid

Saint Andrew and Saint Francis is a 1595-1598 painting by El Greco, produced in Toledo, Spain and now in the Museo del Prado in Madrid.

It shows Andrew the Apostle on the left, holding the diagonal cross on which he was martyred, with Francis of Assisi in his friar's habit to the right.

The work was only recognised during the Spanish Civil War, hanging in the Royal Monastery of La Encarnación in Madrid, to whom it had been presented by the Duke and Duchess of Abrantes in honor of their daughter, Sister Agustina del Niño Jesús, who took her vows in 1676.

== See also ==
- List of works by El Greco

== Bibliography (in Spanish) ==
- ÁLVAREZ LOPERA, José, El Greco, Madrid, Arlanza, 2005, Biblioteca «Descubrir el Arte», (colección «Grandes maestros»). ISBN 84-95503-44-1.
- SCHOLZ-HÄNSEL, Michael, El Greco, Colonia, Taschen, 2003.
- https://web.archive.org/web/20100919110659/http://www.artehistoria.jcyl.es/genios/cuadros/830.htm
