= Portrait of a Doctor =

Painting by El Greco

- Retrato de un médico (Spanish)
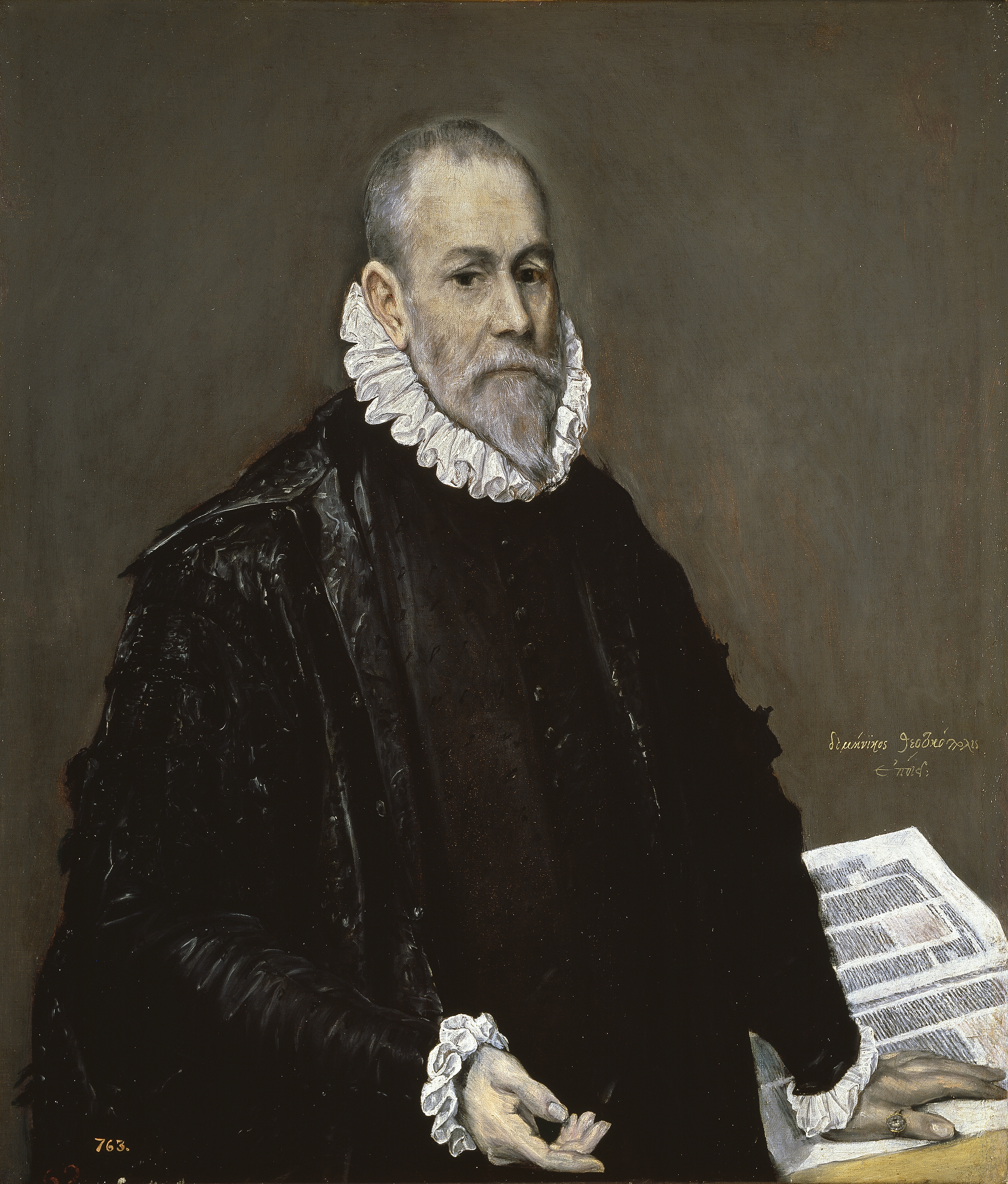
- Artist: El Greco
- Year: 1582-1585
- Medium: Oil on canvas
- Dimensions: 95 cm × 82 cm (37 in × 32 in)
- Location: Museo del Prado; Madrid

Portrait of a Doctor (Spanish: Retrato de un médico) is an oil painting by El Greco.

Painted in Toledo between 1582 and 1585, and on display at the Museo del Prado, some authors suggest the portrait of the anonymous doctor (as defined by his thumb ring) may either be that of Luis de Mercado, Felipe II's chamber doctor, or of Rodrigo de la Fuente, a friend of El Greco.

== See also ==
- List of works by El Greco
