= Christ on the Cross Adored by Two Donors =

Painting by El Greco

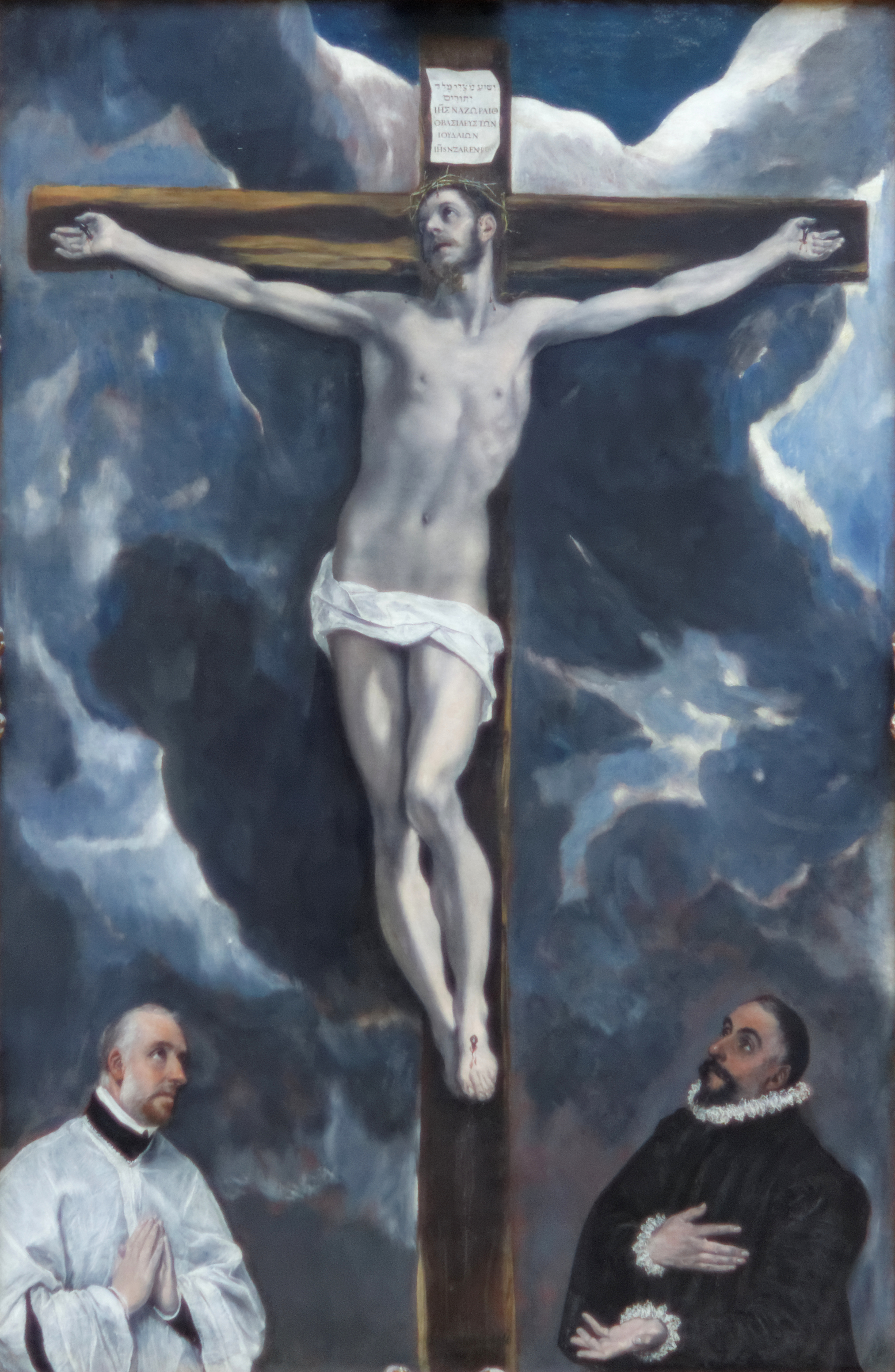
- Artist: El Greco
- Year: c.1590
- Medium: oil on canvas
- Dimensions: 260 cm × 171 cm (100 in × 67 in)
- Location: Louvre, Paris

Christ on the Cross Adored by Two Donors is a c.1590 oil on canvas painting by El Greco, now in the Louvre, Paris.

Intended for a chapel in the Hieronymite monastery in Toledo, it was commissioned by one of the two figures shown beneath Jesus crucified, in the places usually occupied by the Virgin Mary and St John the Evangelist. These had previously been identified as the Covarrubias brothers, sons of the architect Alonso de Covarrubias, but now they are believed to be Dionisio Melgar on the left and an unknown inhabitant of Toledo (possibly Blas de Fuentechada or Pablo Rodríguez de Belalcázar) on the right. Melgar was a canon of the aforementioned monastery and may have been one of the commissioners. It was still in the monastery in 1715, but was acquired by Louis Philippe of France in the 19th century. It appeared in the 1908 autumn salon in Paris, where it was acquired by its present owners.

== See also ==
- List of works by El Greco
