= Saint Jerome (El Greco) =

Painting by El Greco

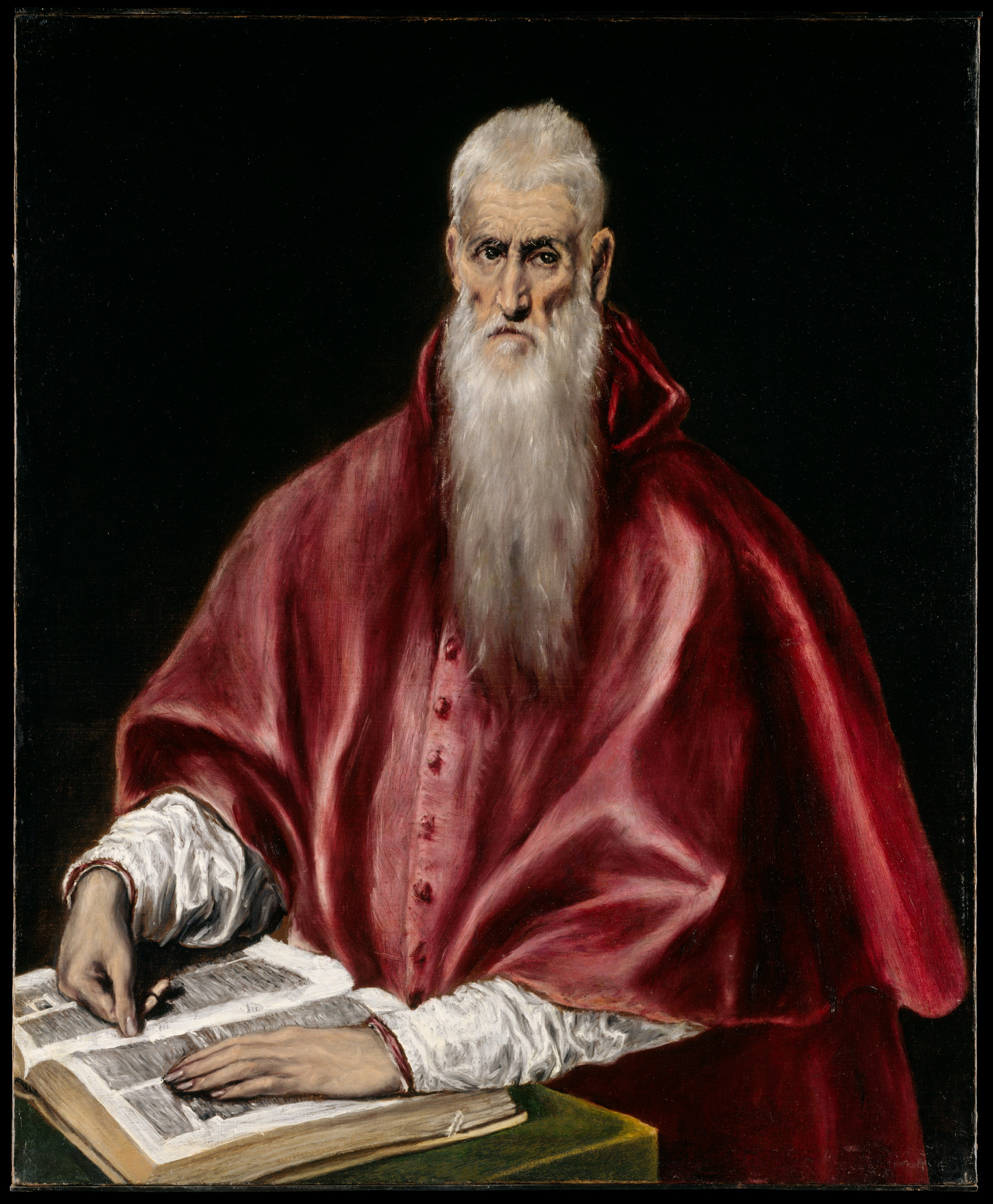
- Artist: El Greco
- Year: 1609
- Medium: oil on canvas
- Dimensions: 108 cm × 87 cm (43 in × 34 in)
- Location: Metropolitan Museum of Art; New York

Saint Jerome is a 1609 painting by El Greco, now in the Metropolitan Museum of Art, New York.

The artist frequently returned to this subject and here shows Jerome dressed as a cardinal in a pose reminiscent of his Portrait of Cardinal Tavera and Portrait of Jerónimo de Cevallos, pointing at an open book on a table covered with a green tapestry. The deep folds in the garments point to the influence of Michelangelo and Byzantine icon painting.

== See also ==
- List of works by El Greco

== Bibliography (in Spanish) ==
- ÁLVAREZ LOPERA, José, El Greco, Madrid, Arlanza, 2005, Biblioteca «Descubrir el Arte», (colección «Grandes maestros»). ISBN 84-9550-344-1.
- SCHOLZ-HÄNSEL, Michael, El Greco, Colonia, Taschen, 2003. ISBN 978-3-8228-3173-1.
- https://web.archive.org/web/20100918075528/http://www.artehistoria.jcyl.es/genios/cuadros/1708.htm
