= Christ Carrying the Cross (El Greco, Barcelona) =

Painting by El Greco

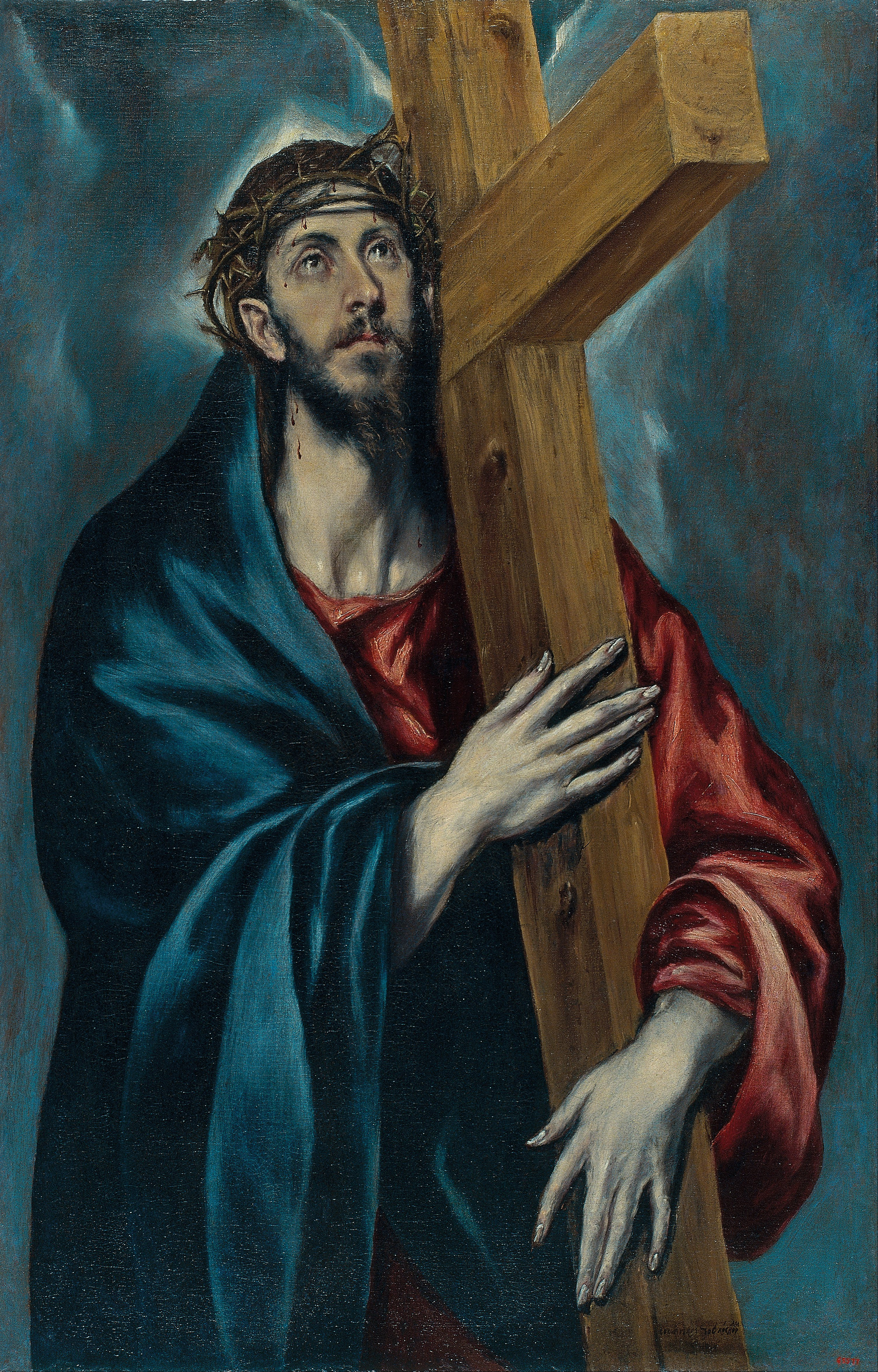
- Artist: El Greco
- Year: 1590-1595
- Location: Museo Nacional de Arte de Cataluña

Christ Bearing the Cross is a 1590-1595 painting by El Greco.

It was acquired by the painter and critic Aureliano de Beruete (1845-1912). It was then owned by the Catalan collector Santiago Espona (1888-1958)., who bequeathed it to the National Art Museum of Catalonia in 1958.

== See also ==
- List of works by El Greco
