= Saint John the Evangelist and Saint Francis =

Painting by El Greco

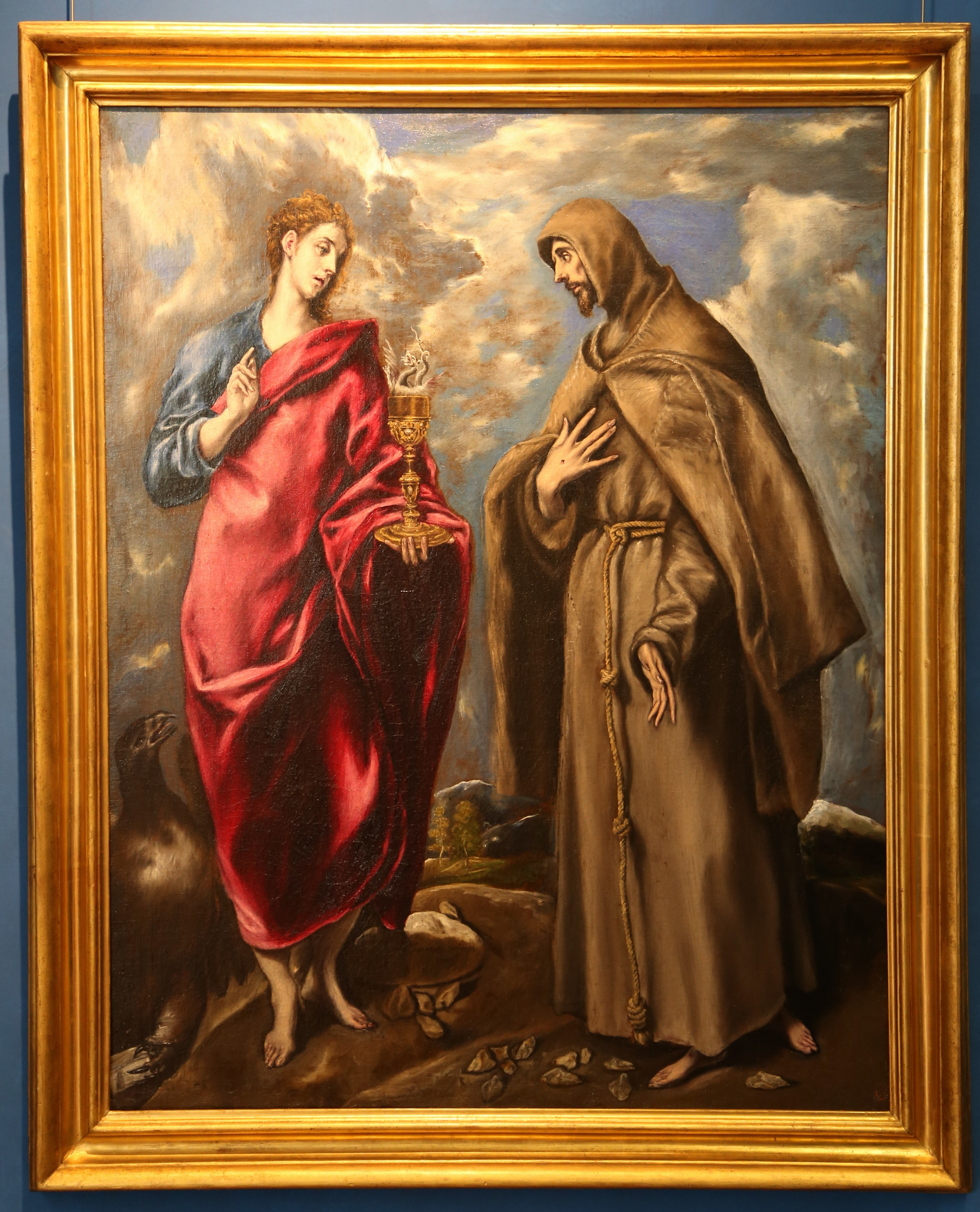
- Artist: El Greco
- Year: c.1600
- Medium: oil on canvas
- Dimensions: 110 cm × 86 cm (43 in × 34 in)
- Location: Uffizi, Florence

Saint John the Evangelist and Saint Francis is a c.1600 oil on canvas painting by the artist El Greco, now in the Uffizi. John is accompanied by an eagle (bottom left) and holds a gold chalice containing his head. Both saints are barefoot. The artist's signature Dominicos Théotokopulos epoiese is on a rock in the centre.

It originally belonged to the ducal family of Sueca in Spain, who kept it at Boadilla del Monte. In 1904 it was inherited by the Ruspoli y Godoy family (the Spanish branch of the Ruspoli family), due to Carlota de Godoy, 2nd Duchess of Sueca's 1821 marriage to prince Camillo Ruspoli, son of Francesco Ruspoli, 3rd Prince of Cerveteri. It was first studied in 1821 by Manuel Bartolomé Cossío in his magnum opus on El Greco. It was studied again in a 1962 two-volume catalogue raisonné of the artist's works by Harold Edwin Wethey. In 1975 it was placed in a new gilded frame and presented to the Uffizi, where it still hangs

== See also ==
- List of works by El Greco
