= Saint Francis and Brother Leo =

1609 painting by El Greco

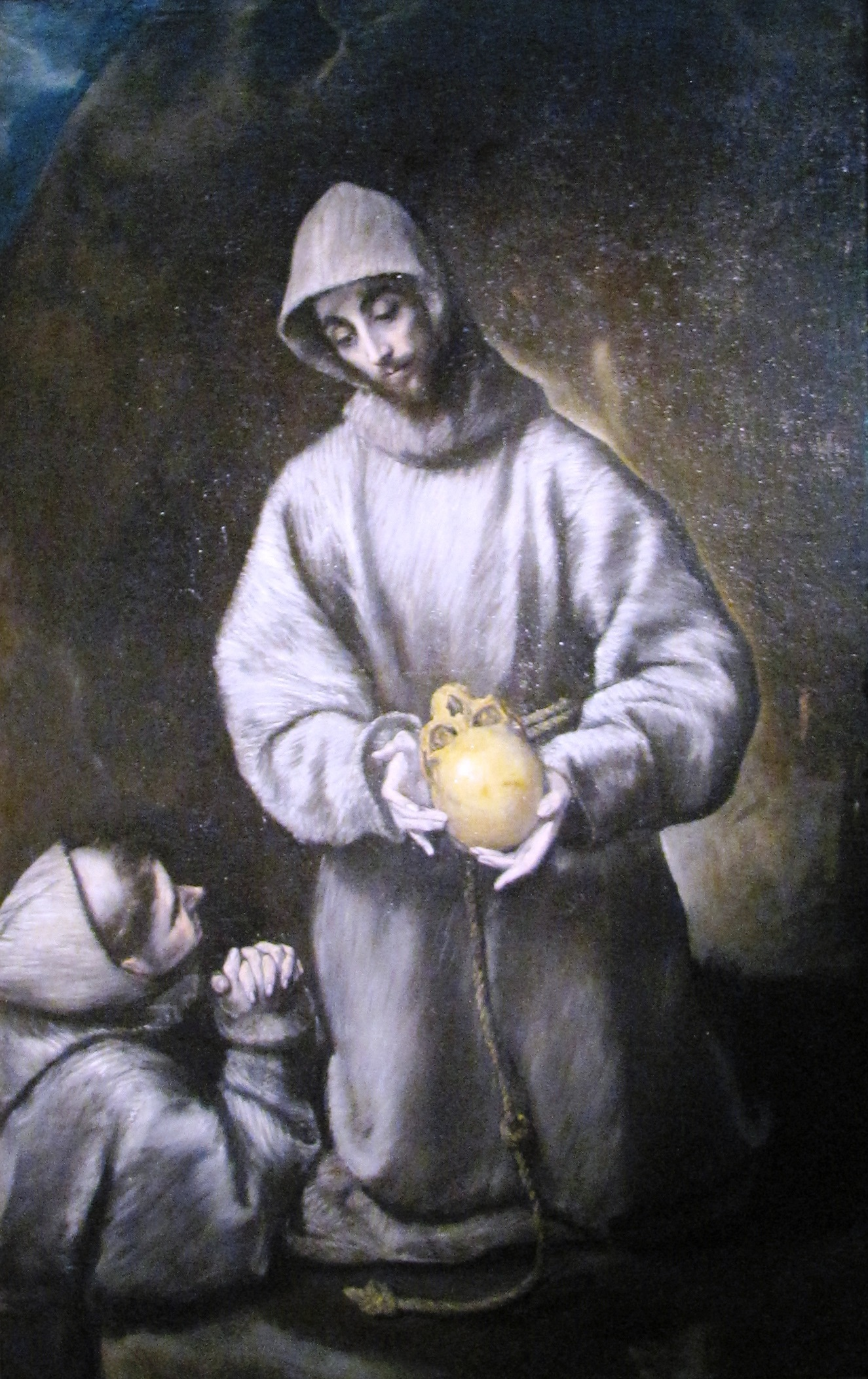
- Artist: El Greco
- Year: 1609
- Medium: oil on canvas
- Dimensions: 155 cm × 100 cm (61 in × 39 in)
- Location: Colegio del Cardenal, Monforte de Lemos

Saint Francis and Brother Leo is a 1609 painting by El Greco, now in the Colegio del Cardenal in Monforte de Lemos, Lugo, Spain.

It shows Francis of Assisi as a meditating hermit, holding a skull. To the left kneels his friend Brother Leo, praying.

== See also ==
- List of works by El Greco

== Bibliography (in Spanish) ==
- ÁLVAREZ LOPERA, José, El Greco, Madrid, Arlanza, 2005, Biblioteca «Descubrir el Arte», (colección «Grandes maestros»). ISBN 84-9550-344-1.
- SCHOLZ-HÄNSEL, Michael, El Greco, Colonia, Taschen, 2003. ISBN 978-3-8228-3173-1.
- https://web.archive.org/web/20100918203001/http://www.artehistoria.jcyl.es/genios/cuadros/6346.htm
