= Annunciation (El Greco, Prado, 1570) =

Painting by El Greco

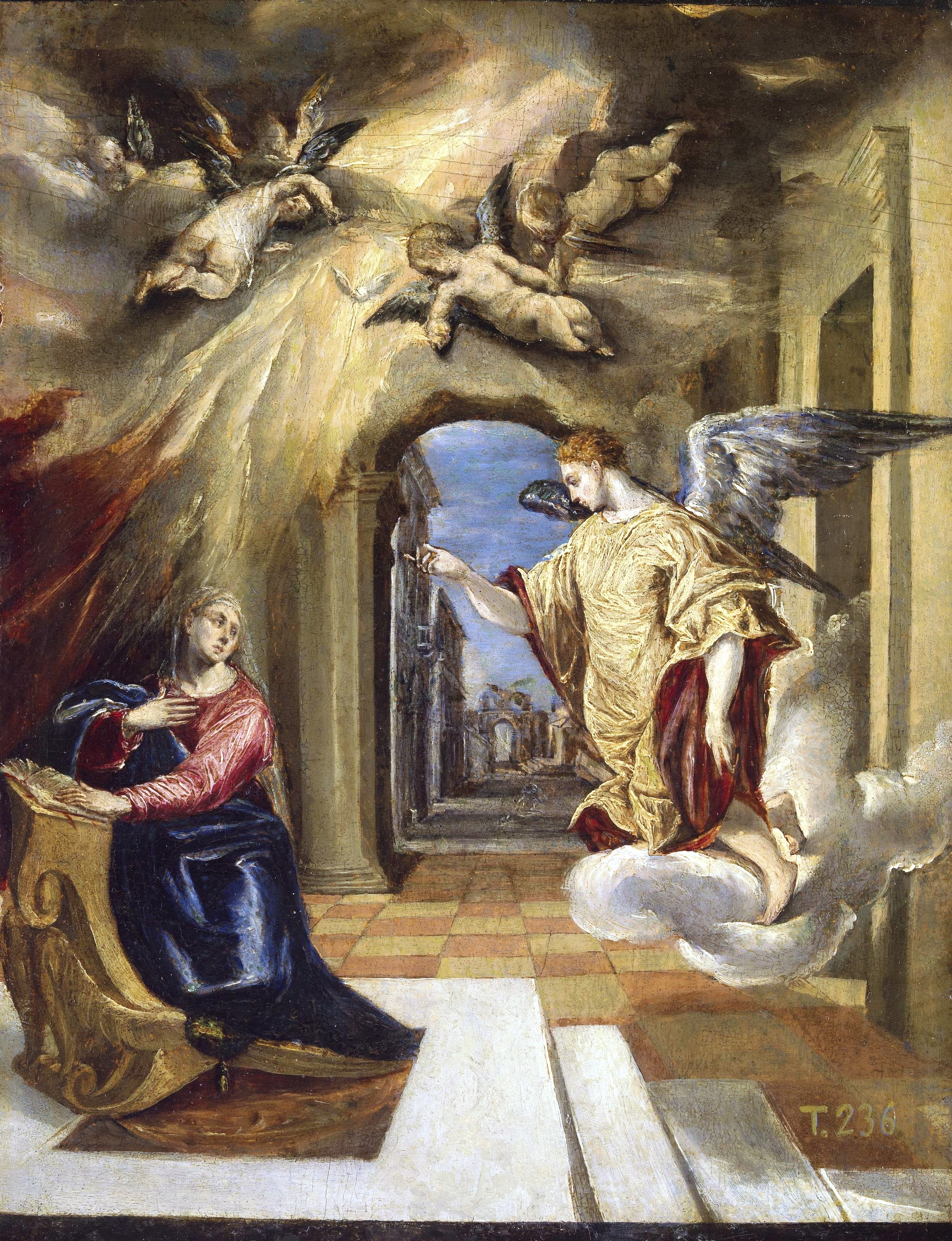
- Artist: El Greco
- Year: 1570
- Medium: oil on panel
- Dimensions: 26.7 cm × 20 cm (10.5 in × 7.9 in)
- Location: Museo del Prado, Madrid

Annunciation is a 1570 painting by the Greek artist of the Spanish Renaissance El Greco, now in the Museo del Prado in Madrid. According to the art historian José Álvarez Lopera, it derives from an engraving by Jacopo Caraglio.

The painting depicts the Annunciation, in which the Archangel Gabriel appears to Mary and informs her that she is pregnant with Jesus.

It is one of the major works produced during the painter's time in Venice, showing the influence of Titian in the figuration of Mary and Tintoretto in its composition, and may be a sketch or composition linked to the Modena Triptych.

== See also ==
- List of works by El Greco

== Sources (in Spanish) ==
- ÁLVAREZ LOPERA, José, El Greco, Madrid, Arlanza, 2005, Biblioteca «Descubrir el Arte», (colección «Grandes maestros»). ISBN 84-9550-344-1.
- SCHOLZ-HÄNSEL, Michael, El Greco, Colonia, Taschen, 2003. ISBN 978-3-8228-3173-1.
- ArteHistoria.com. «Anunciación» [Consulta: 19.12.2010].
- Museo del Prado «La anunciación» [Consulta: 19.12.2010].
