= Saint Lawrence's Vision of the Madonna and Child =

1577 painting by El Greco

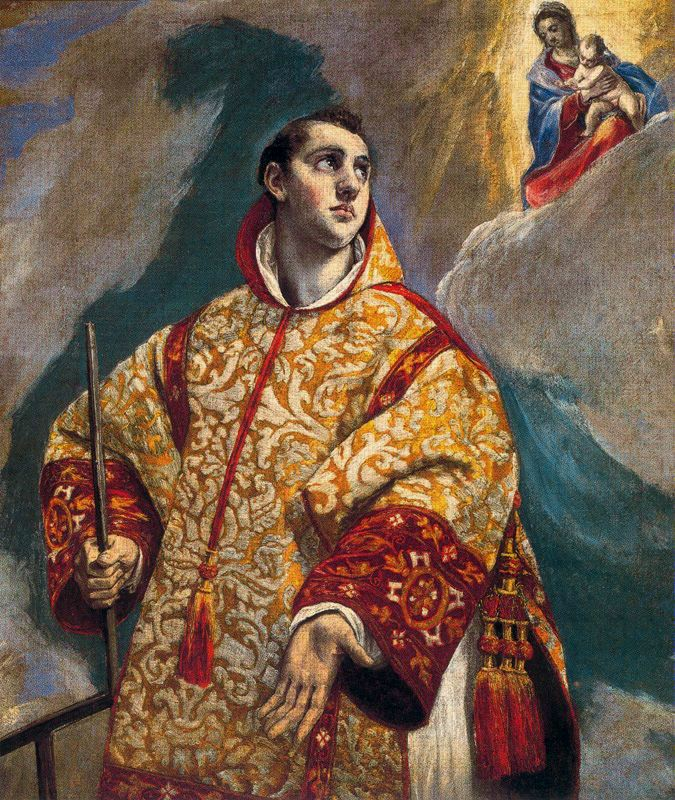
- Artist: El Greco
- Year: 1577
- Medium: oil on canvas
- Dimensions: 119 cm × 102 cm (47 in × 40 in)
- Location: Colegio del Cardenal, Monforte de Lemos

Saint Lawrence's Vision of the Virgin Mary is a 1577 oil on canvas painting by El Greco, produced early in his Toledo period. It was commissioned by Rodrigo de Castro, inquisitor, archbishop of Seville, bishop of Cuenca and bishop of Zamora, making it one of the artist's few private commissions from that time. It is now in the Colegio del Cardenal in Monforte de Lemos.

Its composition and style show the influence of Titian and Michelangelo which the painter had picked up during his time in Italy. It shows Saint Lawrence as a deacon in a finely brocaded dalmatic, holding the grill on which he was martyred and looking upwards to a vision of the Madonna and Child on a cloud.

== See also ==
- List of works by El Greco

== Bibliography ==
- (in Spanish) ÁLVAREZ LOPERA, José, El Greco, Madrid, Arlanza, 2005, Biblioteca «Descubrir el Arte», (colección «Grandes maestros»). ISBN 84-9550-344-1.
- SCHOLZ-HÄNSEL, Michael, El Greco, Colonia, Taschen, 2003. ISBN 978-3-8228-3173-1.
