= Portrait of an Unknown Gentleman =

Painting by El Greco

- Retrato de un caballero desconocido (Spanish)
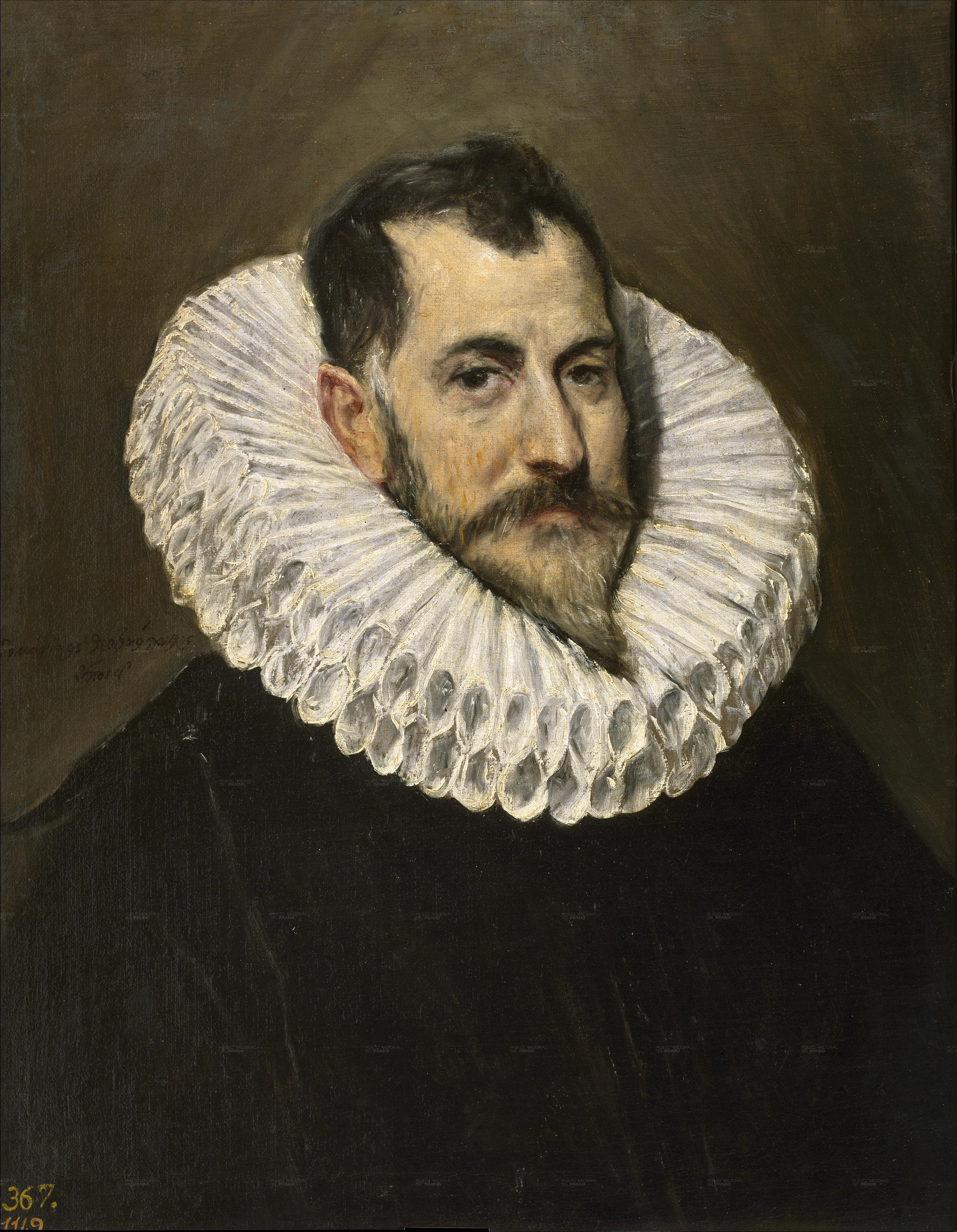
- Artist: El Greco
- Year: 1603-1607
- Medium: Oil on canvas
- Dimensions: 64 cm × 51 cm (25 in × 20 in)
- Location: Museo del Prado; Madrid

Portrait of an Unknown Gentleman (Spanish: Retrato de un caballero desconocido) is an oil painting by El Greco.

Painted in Toledo between 1603 and 1607, and on display at the Museo del Prado, it has been cited as a possible portrait of Miguel de Cervantes, based on the fact that the author and playwright was living near Toledo in 1604 and that he knew people within El Greco's circle of friends.

It is one of a series of secular portraits of unknown gentlemen, all of them dressed in black and wearing white ruffs, against dark backgrounds, the most famous of which is El caballero de la mano en el pecho (The Nobleman with his Hand on his Chest) (ca. 1580).

== See also ==
- List of works by El Greco
