= Christ Carrying the Cross (El Greco, Madrid) =

Painting by El Greco

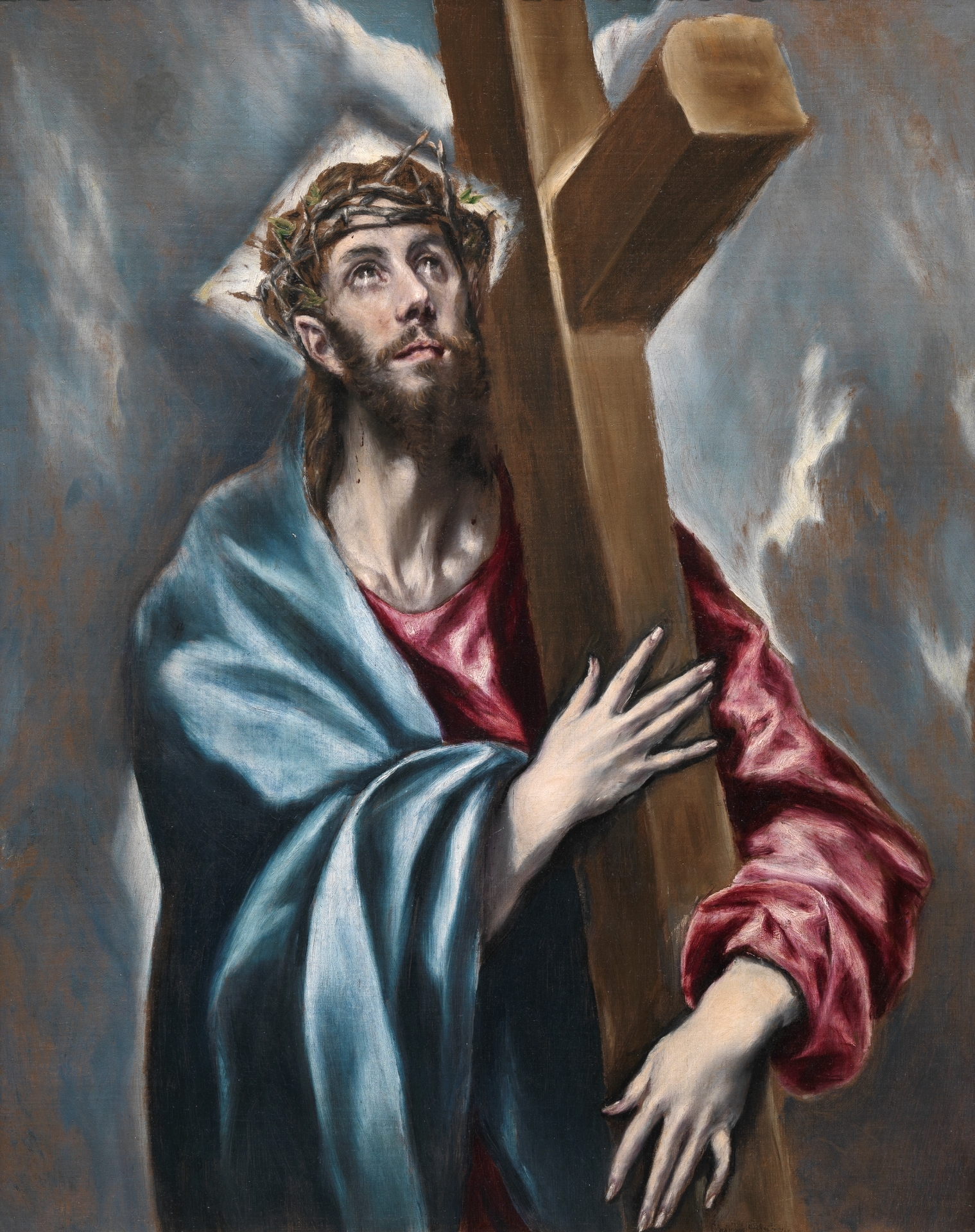
- Artist: El Greco
- Year: 1597-1600
- Medium: oil on canvas
- Dimensions: 108 cm × 78 cm (43 in × 31 in)
- Location: Museo del Prado, Madrid

Christ Carrying the Cross is a 1597–1600 painting by El Greco, belonging to the end of his life in Toledo. It is now in the Museo del Prado in Madrid.

== See also ==
- List of works by El Greco

== Bibliography (in Spanish) ==
- ÁLVAREZ LOPERA, José, El Greco, Madrid, Arlanza, 2005, Biblioteca «Descubrir el Arte», (colección «Grandes maestros»). ISBN 84-95503-44-1.
- SCHOLZ-HÄNSEL, Michael, El Greco, Colonia, Taschen, 2003. ISBN 978-3-8228-3173-1.
- ArteHistoria.com. «Cristo abrazado a la cruz» [Consulta: 02.02.2011].
