= Holy Face of Jesus (El Greco) =

Painting by El Greco

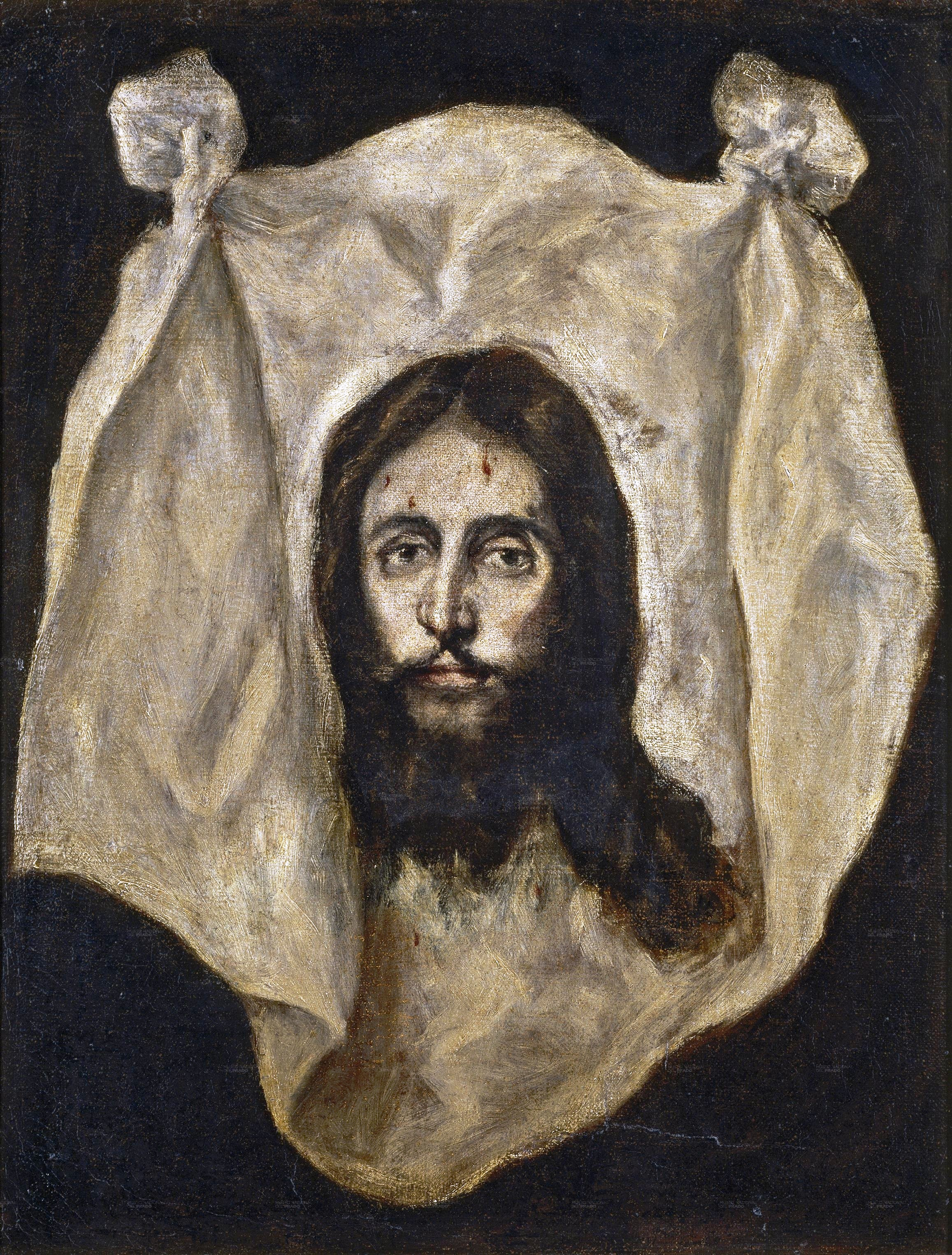
- Artist: El Greco
- Year: 1586-1595
- Medium: oil on canvas
- Dimensions: 71 cm × 54 cm (28 in × 21 in)
- Location: Museo del Prado, Madrid

Holy Face of Jesus (or The Veil of Veronica) is a 1586–1595 painting by El Greco of the Holy Face of Jesus on a veil. It is now in the Museo del Prado, in Madrid, which acquired it in 1944 using funds from a legacy from the conde de Cartagena.

A popular iconographic motif in the Middle Ages, it stems from the story of the woman who offered her veil to Jesus on his way to Calvary in order for Him to wipe His brow, after which His face was imprinted on the material. However the event is not recorded in the Bible and the name Veronica may have developed by wordplay and personification from vera icona (true icon) and by association with the quite separate account of the Veronica who was healed by touching Christ's robe.

== See also ==
- Shroud of Turin
- List of works by El Greco

== Bibliography (in Spanish) ==
- ÁLVAREZ LOPERA, José, El Greco, Madrid, Arlanza, 2005, Biblioteca «Descubrir el Arte», (colección «Grandes maestros»). ISBN 84-95503-44-1.
- SCHOLZ-HÄNSEL, Michael, El Greco, Colonia, Taschen, 2003. ISBN 978-3-8228-3173-1.
