= Last Supper (El Greco) =

1568 painting by El Greco

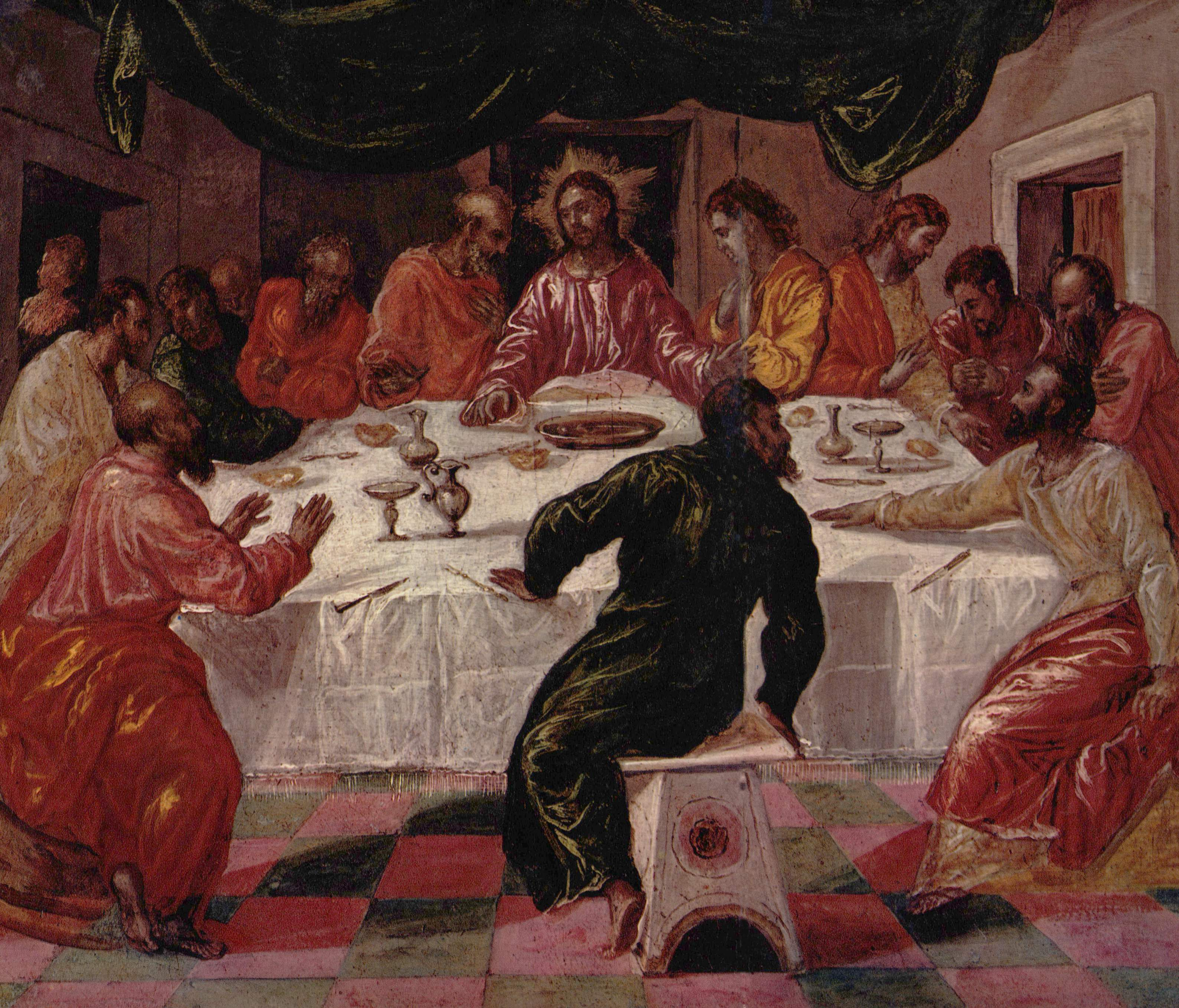
- Artist: El Greco
- Year: 1568
- Medium: Oil on canvas
- Dimensions: 43 cm × 52 cm (17 in × 20 in)
- Location: Pinacoteca Nazionale di Bologna

Last Supper is a 1568 painting by Greek painter sculptor and architect of the Spanish Renaissance Doménikos Theotokópoulos (1541–1614), most widely known as El Greco.

The work is currently collected in the Pinacoteca Nazionale di Bologna.

== See also ==
- List of works by El Greco
