= Saint James the Less (El Greco) =

1609 painting by El Greco

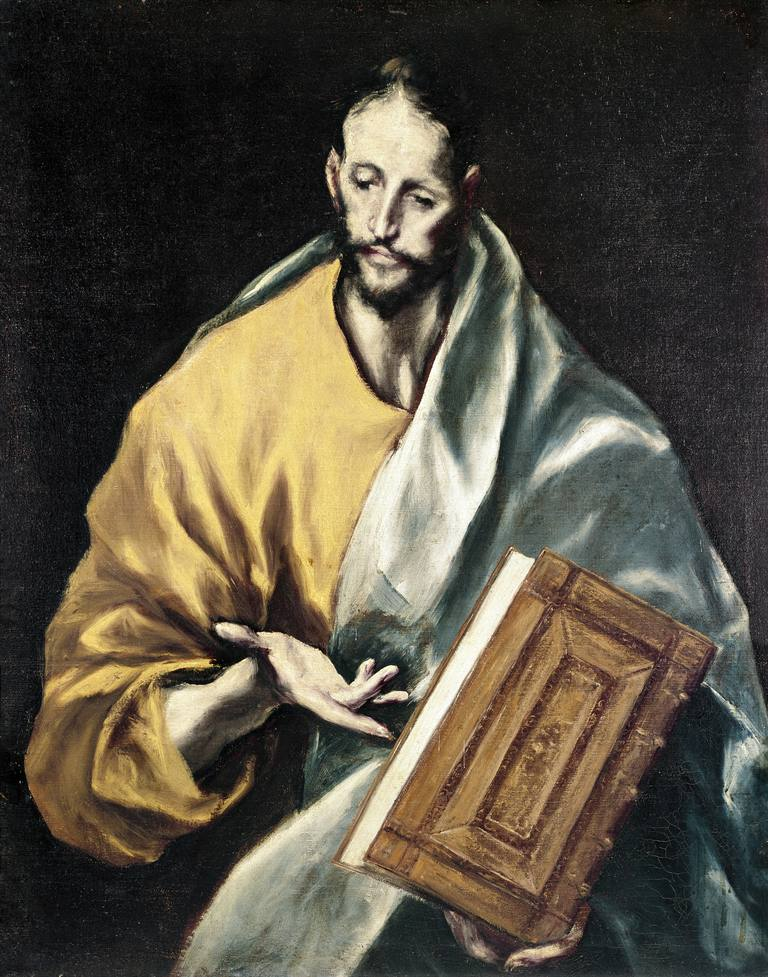
- Artist: El Greco
- Year: 1609
- Medium: oil on canvas
- Dimensions: 98 cm × 78 cm (39 in × 31 in)
- Location: Toledo Cathedral

Saint James the Less is a 1609 painting by El Greco, now in Toledo Cathedral and produced towards the end of his time in that city. It shows James the Less holding a book and with Saint John the Evangelist and other works forms part of the set of works showing the apostles commissioned by cardinal Bernardo de Sandoval y Rojas.

== Bibliography ==
- ÁLVAREZ LOPERA, José, El Greco, Madrid, Arlanza, 2005, Biblioteca «Descubrir el Arte», (colección «Grandes maestros»). ISBN 84-9550-344-1.
- SCHOLZ-HÄNSEL, Michael, El Greco, Colonia, Taschen, 2003. ISBN 978-3-8228-3173-1.
- ArteHistoria.com. «Santiago el Menor». [Consulta: 09.01.2011].
