= Saint Peter (El Greco) =

1608 painting by El Greco

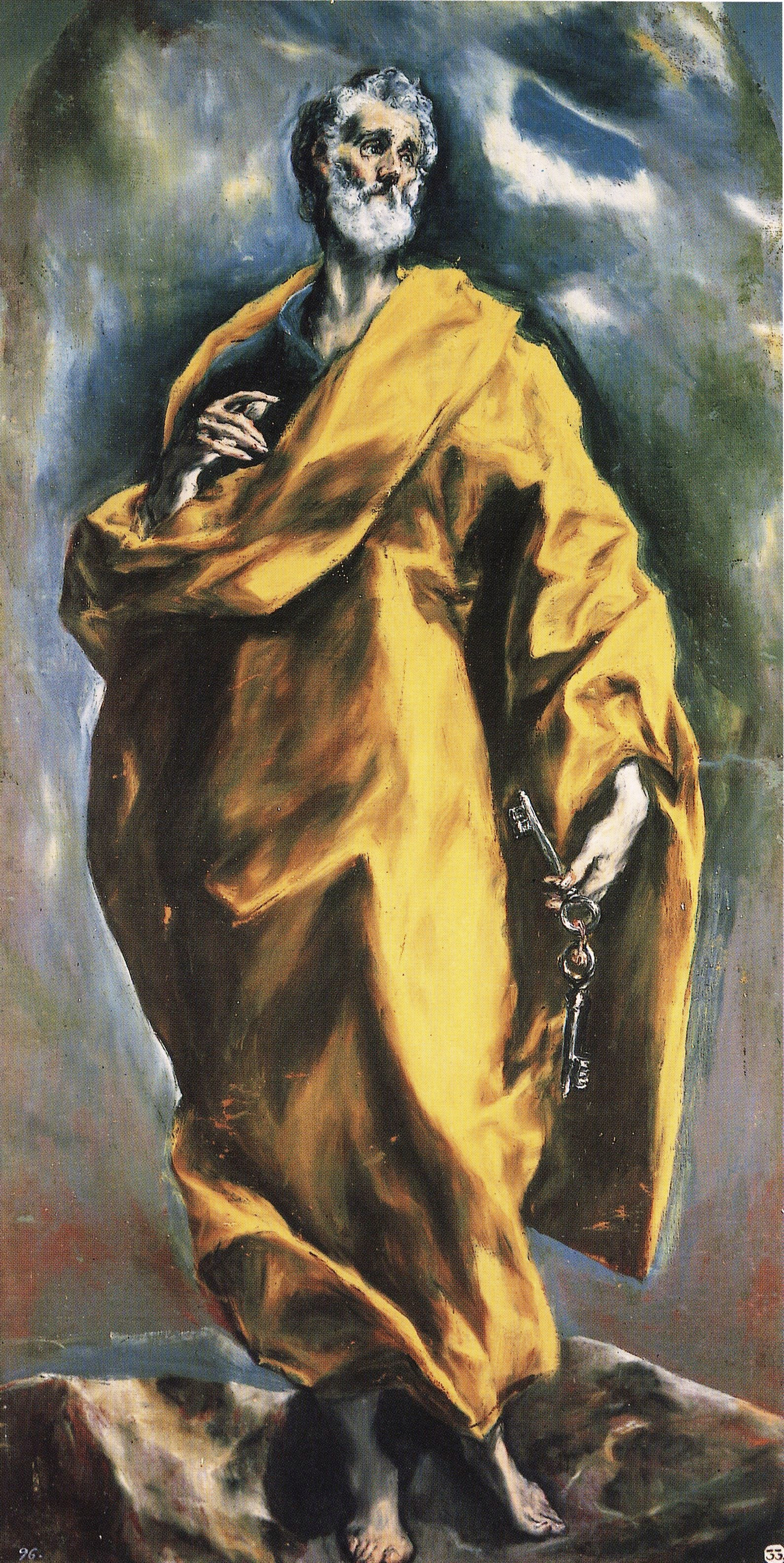
- Artist: El Greco
- Year: 1608
- Medium: oil on canvas
- Dimensions: 207 cm × 105 cm (81 in × 41 in)
- Location: Monasterio del Escorial, San Lorenzo de El Escorial (Madrid).

Saint Peter is a 1608 oil on canvas painting produced by El Greco in Toledo towards the end of his life. It is now in the Monasterio del Escorial near Madrid.

It shows the apostle standing atop a mountain holding a set of keys, referring to Christ's commission to Peter as "the rock upon which I will build my church. I will give you the keys of the kingdom of heaven." (Matthew 16: 18–19). The heavy drapery and the disproportion between the head and the body are typical of the artist.

== See also ==
- List of works by El Greco

== Bibliography ==
- (in Spanish) ÁLVAREZ LOPERA, José, El Greco, Madrid, Arlanza, 2005, Biblioteca «Descubrir el Arte», (colección «Grandes maestros»). ISBN 84-9550-344-1.
- (in Spanish) SCHOLZ-HÄNSEL, Michael, El Greco, Colonia, Taschen, 2003. ISBN 978-3-8228-3173-1.
