= Agony in the Garden (El Greco, Andújar) =

Painting by El Greco

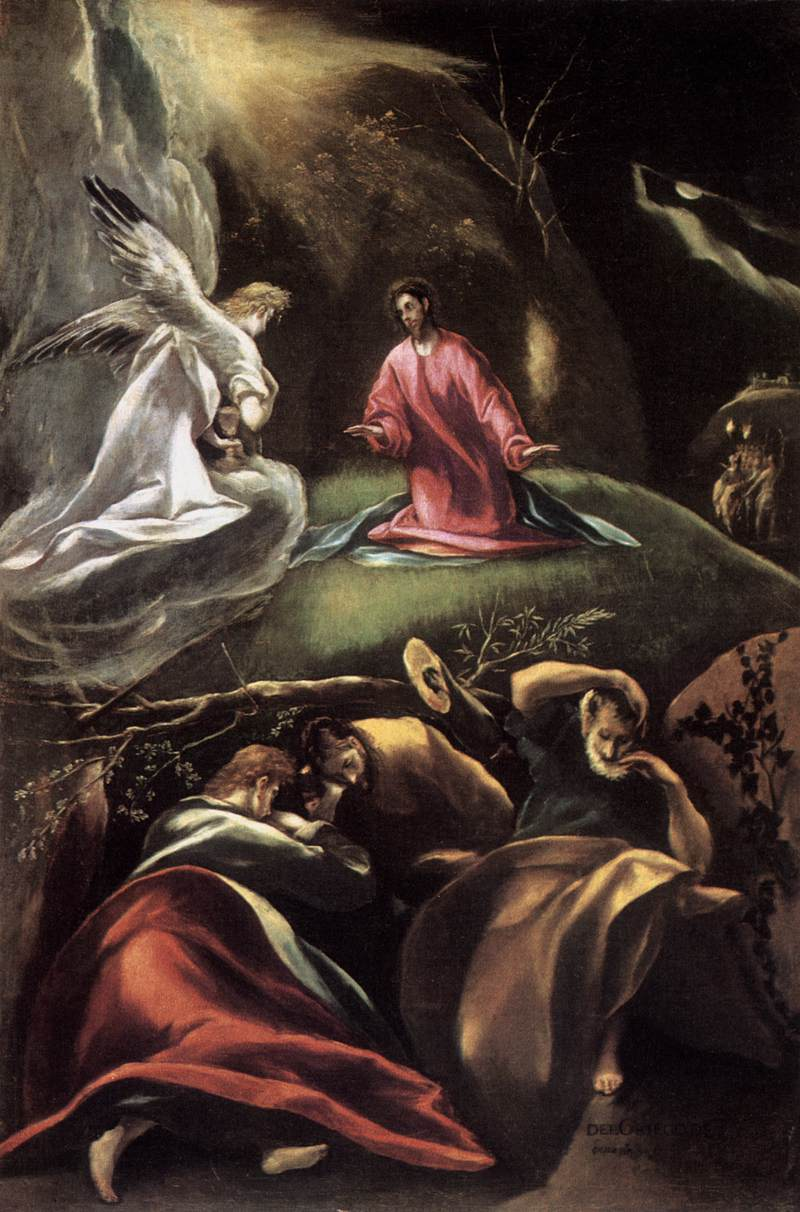
- Artist: El Greco
- Year: 1597-1607
- Medium: oil on canvas
- Dimensions: 169 cm × 112 cm (67 in × 44 in)
- Location: Santa María la Mayor, Andújar

Agony in the Garden is a 1597-1607 oil on canvas painting by El Greco. It is now in Santa María la Mayor church in Andújar.

The painter often returned to this subject of the Agony in the Garden. At the top of the work are Christ and an angel, with the apostles Peter, John and James sleeping at the bottom. Judas approaches in the right-hand background.

== See also ==
- List of works by El Greco

== Bibliography ==
- (in Spanish) Álvarez Lopera, José, El Greco, Madrid, Arlanza, 2005, Biblioteca «Descubrir el Arte», (colección «Grandes maestros»). ISBN 84-95503-44-1.
- (in Spanish) Scholz-Hänsel, Michael, El Greco, Colonia, Taschen, 2003. ISBN 978-3-8228-3173-1.
