= Portrait of a Gentleman (El Greco) =

Painting by El Greco

Portrait of a Nobleman
- Retrato de un caballero (Spanish)
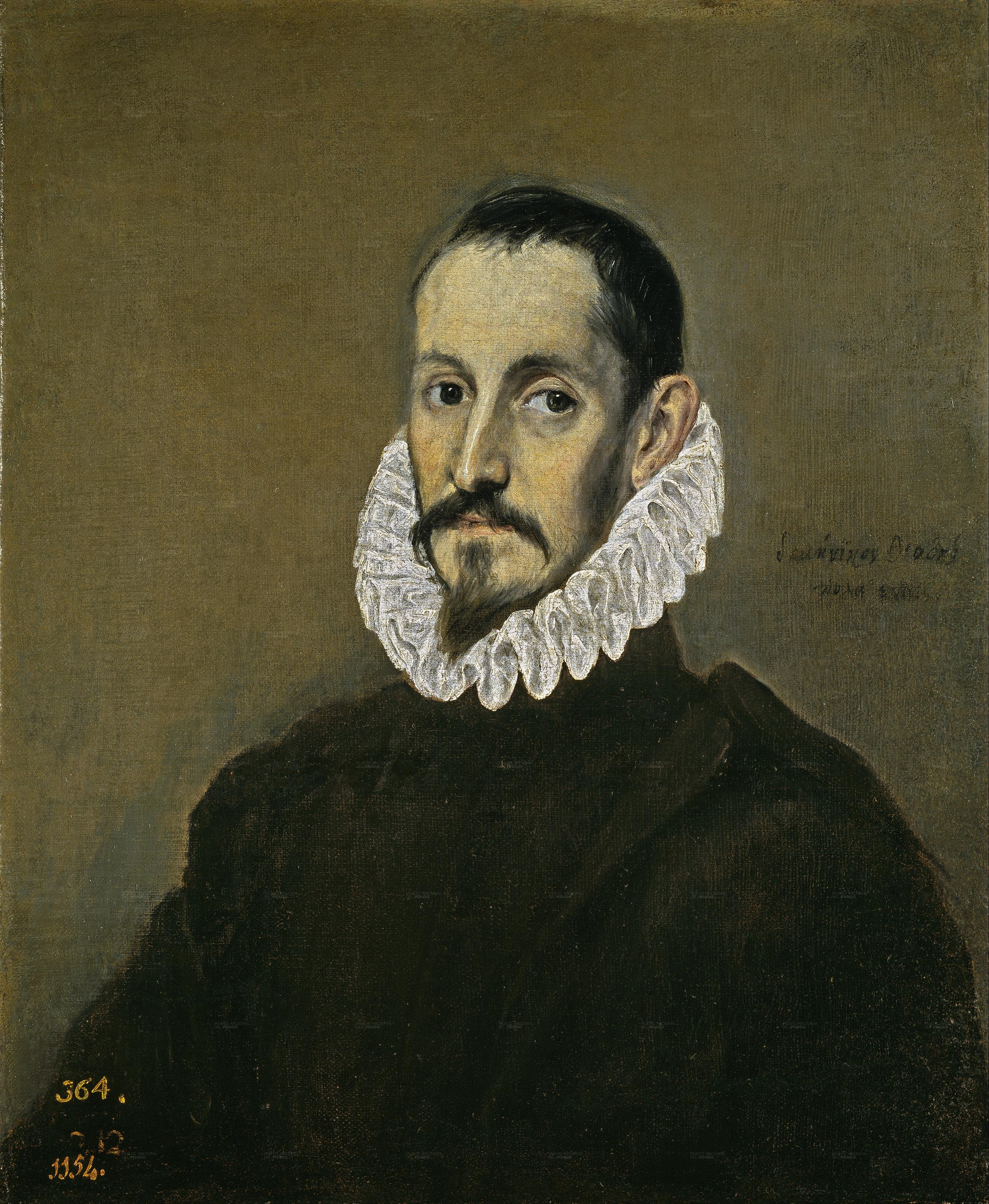
- Artist: El Greco
- Year: c. 1586
- Medium: Oil on canvas
- Dimensions: 67 cm × 55 cm (26 in × 22 in)
- Location: Museo del Prado, Madrid

Portrait of a Nobleman (Spanish: Retrato de un caballero) is a c. 1586 oil on canvas portrait by El Greco, originally hung in the Quinta del Duque del Arco in Royal Palace of El Pardo in Madrid but now in the Museo del Prado. Its subject is unknown.

== See also ==
- List of works by El Greco
