= Saint Anthony of Padua (El Greco) =

1580 painting by El Greco

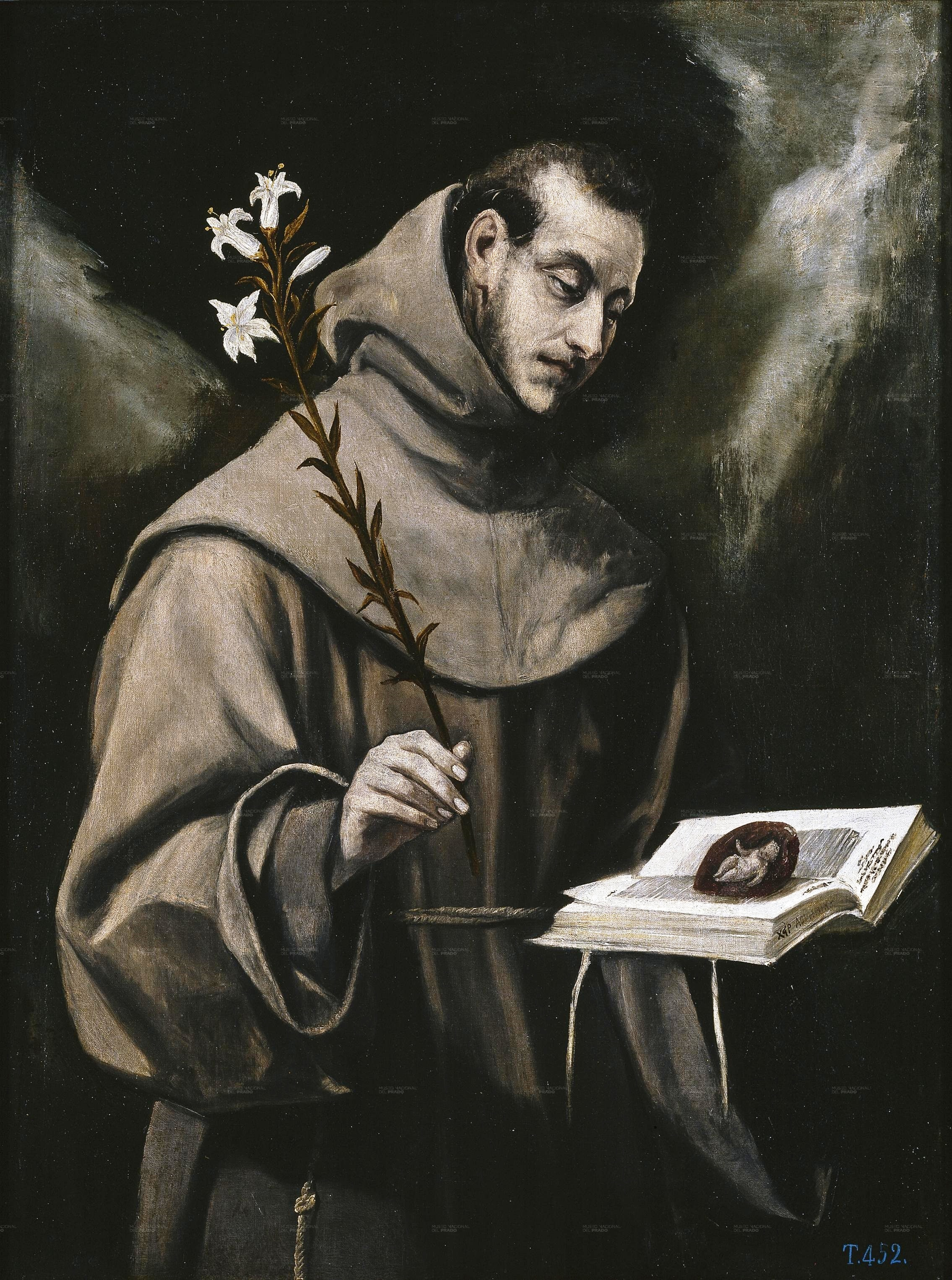
- Artist: El Greco
- Year: 1580
- Medium: oil on canvas
- Dimensions: 104 cm × 79 cm (41 in × 31 in)
- Location: Museo del Prado, Madrid

Saint Anthony of Padua is a 1580 oil on canvas painting by El Greco, now in the Museo del Prado in Madrid.

It shows Anthony of Padua with his standard attributes of a lily, an open book and an image of the Christ Child. The cloudy background shows the heavy influence of Michelangelo on the young artist, whilst the fast brushstrokes show that of Titian and Tintoretto. On the edge of the book is the artist's signature "IN MANO DI DOMENICO" in maiuscule Greek characters.

== See also ==
- List of works by El Greco

== Bibliography ==
- (in Spanish) ÁLVAREZ LOPERA, José, El Greco, Madrid, Arlanza, 2005, Biblioteca «Descubrir el Arte», (colección «Grandes maestros»). ISBN 84-9550-344-1.
- (in Spanish) SCHOLZ-HÄNSEL, Michael, El Greco, Colonia, Taschen, 2003. ISBN 978-3-8228-3173-1.
