= Saint John the Evangelist (El Greco, Madrid) =

Painting by El Greco

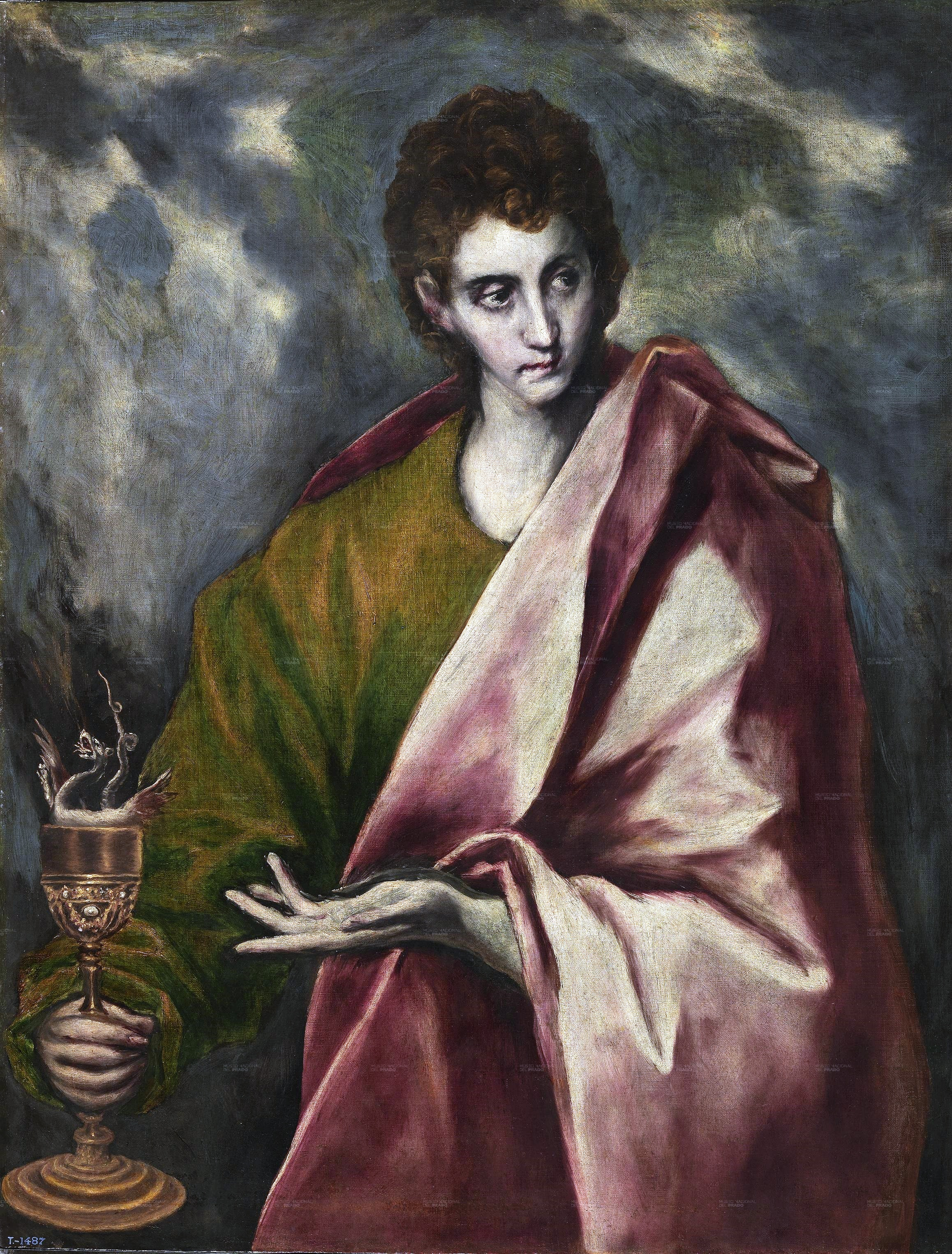
- Artist: El Greco
- Year: c.1605
- Medium: oil on canvas
- Dimensions: 90 cm × 77 cm (35 in × 30 in)
- Location: Museo del Prado, Madrid

Saint John the Evangelist is a c.1605 work by El Greco, produced towards the end of his time in Toledo, Spain. It now hangs in the Museo del Prado, to which it was left in 1921 by the collector César Cabañas Caballero.

The painting shows John the Evangelist as a young man holding a chalice, with a small dragon in it, referring to his surviving a poisoned cup of wine in prison. It is very similar to the painting of the same subject by the same painter in Toledo Cathedral.

== See also ==
- List of works by El Greco

== Bibliography (in Spanish) ==
- ÁLVAREZ LOPERA, José, El Greco, Madrid, Arlanza, 2005, Biblioteca «Descubrir el Arte», (colección «Grandes maestros»). ISBN 84-9550-344-1.
- SCHOLZ-HÄNSEL, Michael, El Greco, Colonia, Taschen, 2003. ISBN 978-3-8228-3173-1.
- ArteHistoria.com. «San Juan Evangelista». [Consulta: 09.01.2011].
