= List of apostolados =

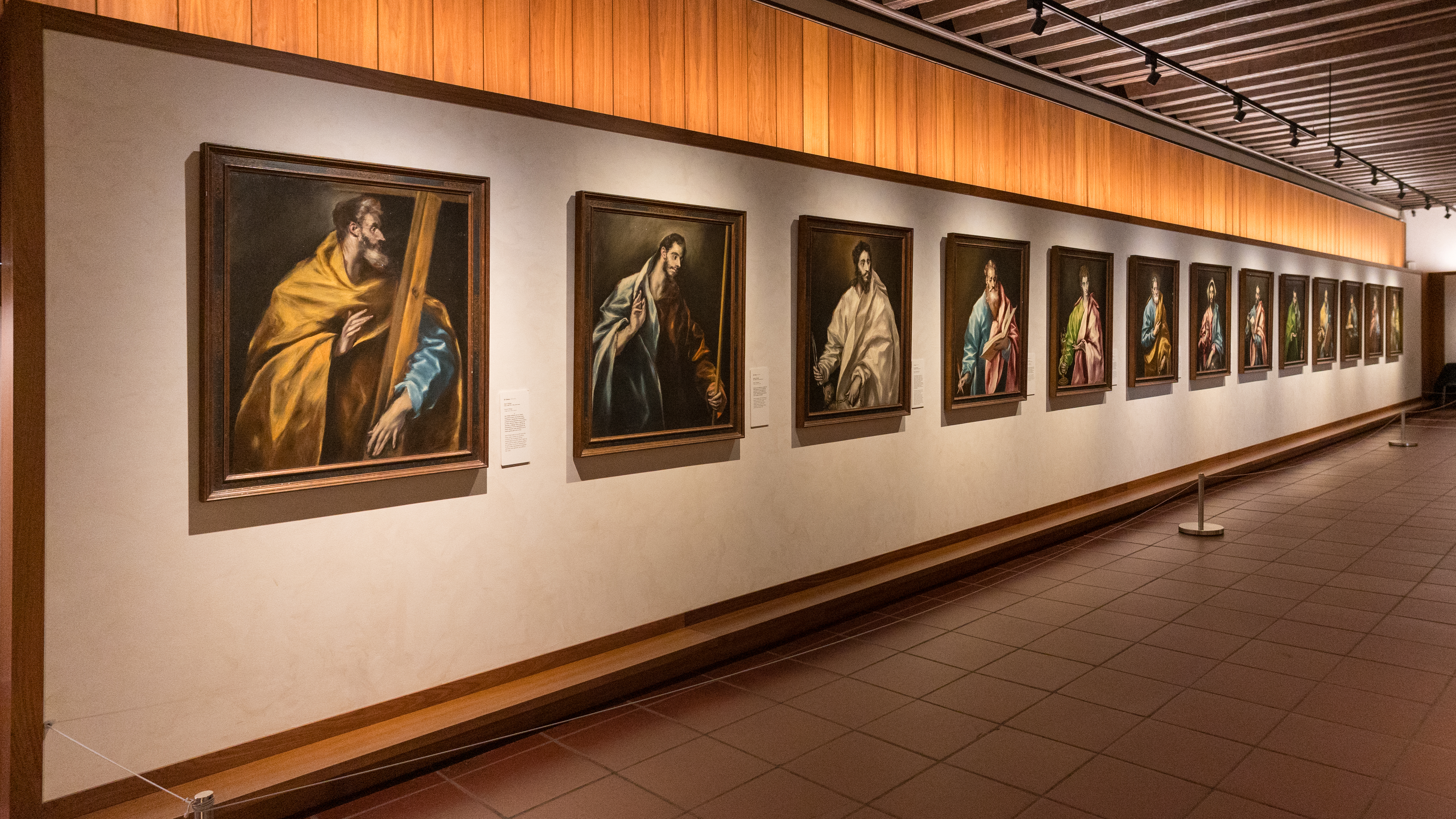
Apostolado paintings in El Greco Museum, Toledo

An apostolado (from Spanish; lit. 'apostolate'), or apostles series, is a series of individual portrait paintings of the apostles of Jesus Christ, sometimes including other figures, such as Jesus, Luke, Mary, or Paul. The first potential example of an apostolado stems from a pair of portraits of the apostles James the Elder and Philip by Albrecht Dürer in 1516, which he may have intended as a full series of twelve. In Spain, apostolados are a prevalent genre of art of the apostles, being popularized by Greco-Spanish painter El Greco and leading to other renowned artists of the genre such as Francisco de Zurbarán, Peter Paul Rubens, and Anthony van Dyck. Images of saints, and therefore the apostles, became popular in Catholic Europe during the Renaissance as a result of the Counter-Reformation, which in turn derived from a heavy emphasis of the Catholic doctrine of intercession of saints and opposition to Protestant iconoclasm.

== Apostolados ==
Although the concept of the apostles in the context of Christianity generally refers to the first twelve apostles of Jesus Christ as enumerated in the Gospels (Judas Iscariot being replaced by Matthias due to his treachery), some apostolados contain portraits of other important figures in Christianity, such as Jesus, Paul, Mary, and/or Luke.

— Unknown availability

Apostolados
Series title	Artist	Notes	Andrew the First-Called	Bartholomew the Apostle	James the Elder	James the Younger	John the Beloved	Jude the Apostle	Matthew the Evangelist	Matthias the Apostle	Peter the Rock	Philip the Apostle	Simon the Zealot	Thomas the Twin	Jesus the Nazarene	Paul the Apostle	Luke the Evangelist	Ref(s).
Dürer's Apostle series	Albrecht Dürer	(Note: Dürer's two paintings were "perhaps the first separate, single paintings intended to be 'portraits' of the apostles." In addition, two other unknown apostles' portraits are mentioned.)	—N/a	—N/a	The Apostle James the Elder (Dürer); 1516; Uffizi	—N/a	—N/a	—N/a	—N/a	—N/a	—N/a	Saint Philip (Dürer); 1516; Uffizi	—N/a	—N/a	—N/a	—N/a	—N/a	
Apostolado de San Feliz	El Greco		Saint Andrew (El Greco, Oviedo); c. 1590; Museum of Fine Arts of Asturias	—N/a	Saint James the Greater (El Greco, Oviedo); c. 1590; Museum of Fine Arts of Asturias	Saint James the Lesser (El Greco, Oviedo); c. 1590; Museum of Fine Arts of Asturias	John the Evangelist (El Greco, Oviedo); c. 1590; Museum of Fine Arts of Asturias	Saint Judas Thadeus (El Greco, Oviedo); c. 1590; Museum of Fine Arts of Asturias	Saint Matthew (El Greco, Oviedo); c. 1590; Museum of Fine Arts of Asturias	—N/a	Saint Peter (El Greco, Oviedo); c. 1590; Museum of Fine Arts of Asturias	Saint Philip (El Greco, Oviedo); c. 1590; Museum of Fine Arts of Asturias	Saint Simon (El Greco, Oviedo); c. 1590; Museum of Fine Arts of Asturias	Saint Thomas (El Greco, Oviedo); c. 1590; Museum of Fine Arts of Asturias	—N/a	Saint Paul (El Greco, Oviedo); c. 1590; Museum of Fine Arts of Asturias	Saint Luke (El Greco, Oviedo); c. 1590; Museum of Fine Arts of Asturias	
Apostolado de Almadrones	El Greco and his workshop	(Note: Only eight paintings were made by El Greco and his workshop in the parish church of Almadrones, Guadalajara Province. At first it was believed that a ninth portrait, that of John, was also a part of the series, however this was later proven false.)	The Apostle St. Andrew (El Greco, Los Angeles); c. 1600; Los Angeles County Museum of Art	—N/a	Saint James the Great (El Greco, Madrid); 1610; Museo del Prado	—N/a	—N/a	—N/a	St. Matthew (El Greco, Indianapolis); 1610 – 1614; Indianapolis Museum of Art	—N/a	—N/a	—N/a	St. Simon (El Greco, Indianapolis); 1610 – 1614; Indianapolis Museum of Art	Saint Thomas the Apostle (El Greco, Madrid); 1608 – 1614; Los Angeles County Museum of Art	The Saviour (El Greco, Madrid); 1608 – 1614; Museo del Prado	Saint Paul (El Greco, Madrid); 1610 – 1614; Museo del Prado	Saint Luke (El Greco, Madrid); 1610 – 1614; Indianapolis Museum of Art	
Apostolate of the Museo del Greco	El Greco and his workshop		The Apostle St. Andrew (El Greco, Toledo); c. 1610 – c. 1614; Museo del Greco	Bartholomew the Apostle (El Greco, Toledo); c. 1610 – c. 1614; Museo del Greco	Saint James the Great (El Greco, Toledo); c. 1610 – c. 1614; Museo del Greco	Saint James the Less (El Greco, Toledo); c. 1610 – c. 1614; Museo del Greco	Saint John the Evangelist (El Greco, Toledo, 1660); c. 1610 – c. 1614; Museo del Greco	Apostle St Thaddeus (Jude); c. 1610 – c. 1614; Museo del Greco	Apostle Saint Matthew (El Greco, Toledo); c. 1610 – c. 1614; Museo del Greco	—N/a	Apostle Saint Peter (El Greco, Toledo); c. 1610 – c. 1614; Museo del Greco	Apostle Saint Philip (El Greco, Toledo); c. 1610 – c. 1614; Museo del Greco	Apostle Saint Simon (El Greco, Toledo); c. 1610 – c. 1614; Museo del Greco	Apostle St Thomas (El Greco, Toledo); c. 1610 – c. 1614; Museo del Greco	Christ as Savior (El Greco, Toledo); c. 1610 – c. 1614; Museo del Greco	Apostle Saint Paul (El Greco, Toledo); c. 1610 – c. 1614; Museo del Greco	—N/a	
Apostolado Lerma	Peter Paul Rubens	(Note: The series was painted by Rubens around 1612 for a commission by Francisco de Sandoval y Rojas, 1st Duke of Lerma. The series originally included Jesus and Paul, but not Matthias. The painting of Jesus has since been lost.)	The Apostle Andrew (Rubens); c. 1611; Museo del Prado	Saint Bartholomew (Rubens); c. 1611; Museo del Prado	Saint James the Greater (Rubens); 1612 – 1613; Museo del Prado	The Apostle James the Less (Rubens); 1612 – 1613; Los Angeles County Museum of Art	Saint John the Evangelist (Rubens); c. 1611; Museo del Prado	—N/a	Saint Matthew (Rubens); c. 1611; Museo del Prado	St. Matthias (Rubens); c. 1611; Museo del Prado	Saint Peter (Rubens); 1610 – 1612; Museo del Prado	Saint Philip (Rubens); c. 1611; Museo del Prado	Saint Simon (Rubens); c. 1611; Museo del Prado	The Apostle Thomas (Rubens); c. 1612 – c. 1613; Museo del Prado	—N/a	St. Paul (Rubens); c. 1611; Museo del Prado	—N/a	
Böhler series	Anthony van Dyck	(Note: The series receives its name from Julius Böhler, a German art dealer who acquired the series around 1914. Originally composed of 13 pieces, they were later scattered after the subsequent sales of Böhler.)	The Apostle Andrew (van Dyck); 1618; Museo de Arte de Ponce	The Apostle Saint Bartholomew (van Dyck); 1618 – 1620; Staatliche Kunstsammlungen Dresden	Saint James the Greater (van Dyck); c. 1620; Private collection	—N/a	Saint John the Evangelist (van Dyck); 1618 – 1620; Museum of Fine Arts (Budapest)	The Apostle Judas Thaddeus (van Dyck); c. 1619 – 1621; Kunsthistorisches Museum	The Apostle Matthew (van Dyck); c. 1618 – 1620; Rubenshuis	Saint Matthias (van Dyck); c. 1619; Yale University Art Gallery	Apostle Peter (van Dyck); c. 1600; Private collection	The Apostle Philip (van Dyck); c. 1619 – c. 1621; Kunsthistorisches Museum	The Apostle Simon (van Dyck); c. 1619 – c. 1621; Kunsthistorisches Museum	Apostle Thomas (van Dyck); c. 1600; Private collection	Christ carrying the Cross (van Dyck); unknown; Musei di Strada Nuova	Saint Paul (van Dyck); c. 1618 – 1620; Landesmuseum Hannover	—N/a	
Apostolado del Prado	Jusepe de Ribera		Saint Andrew (Ribera, Madrid, 1641); 1641; Museo del Prado	Saint Bartholomew (Ribera); c. 1630; Museo del Prado	Saint James the Greater (Ribera); c. 1630 – 1635; Museo del Prado	Saint James the Less (Ribera); by 1652; Museo del Prado	—N/a	Saint Judas Thaddaeus (Ribera); c. 1630 – 1635; Musea del Prado	—N/a	—N/a	San Pedro (Ribera); c. 1630; Musea del Prado	Saint Philip (Ribera); c. 1630 – c. 1635; Museo del Prado	Saint Simon (Ribera); c. 1630 – c. 1635; Museo del Prado	Saint Thomas (Ribera); c. 1630 – c. 1635; Museo del Prado	Christ the Saviour (Ribera); by 1652; Museo del Prado	Saint Paul (Ribera); c. 1600; Museo del Prado	—N/a	
The Twelve Apostles	Francisco de Zurbarán		Saint Andrew (Zurbarán, Lisbon); c. 1633; National Museum of Ancient Art	Saint Bartholomew (Zurbarán); 1633; National Museum of Ancient Art	Saint James the Great (Zurbarán); 1633; National Museum of Ancient Art	—N/a	Saint John the Evangelist (Zurbarán); c. 1633; National Museum of Ancient Art	Saint Judas Thaddaeus or Saint Matthew; c. 1633; National Museum of Ancient Art	Saint Matthew (Zurbarán); c. 1633; National Museum of Ancient Art	—N/a	Saint Peter (Zurbarán); c. 1633; National Museum of Ancient Art	Saint Philip (Zurbarán); c. 1633; National Museum of Ancient Art	Saint Simon (Zurbarán); c. 1633; National Museum of Ancient Art	Saint Thomas (Zurbarán); c. 1633; National Museum of Ancient Art	—N/a	Saint Paul (Zurbarán); c. 1630 – 1635; National Museum of Ancient Art	—N/a	
Rembrandt's apostles and evangelists	Rembrandt	(Note: According to art historian Otto Benesch, Rembrandt created an unfinished and loosely-conceived series of the apostles, evangelists, Mary, and Jesus during 1661, of which seven were identified. However, F. Grossman of The Burlington Magazine wrote that it was "rather doubtful whether these paintings were conceived as a complete set".)	—N/a	The Apostle Bartholomew (Rembrandt); 1661; Getty Center	Saint James the Greater (Rembrandt); 1661; Unknown collection	—N/a	—N/a	—N/a	Saint Matthew and the Angel (Rembrandt); 1661; Louvre	—N/a	—N/a	—N/a	gr: The Apostle Simon (Rembrandt); 1661; Kunsthaus Zürich	—N/a	Christ with Arms Folded; 1661; The Hyde Collection	Self-Portrait as the Apostle Paul; 1661; Rijksmuseum	—N/a	
