= Saint James the Great (El Greco) =

1610 painting by El Greco

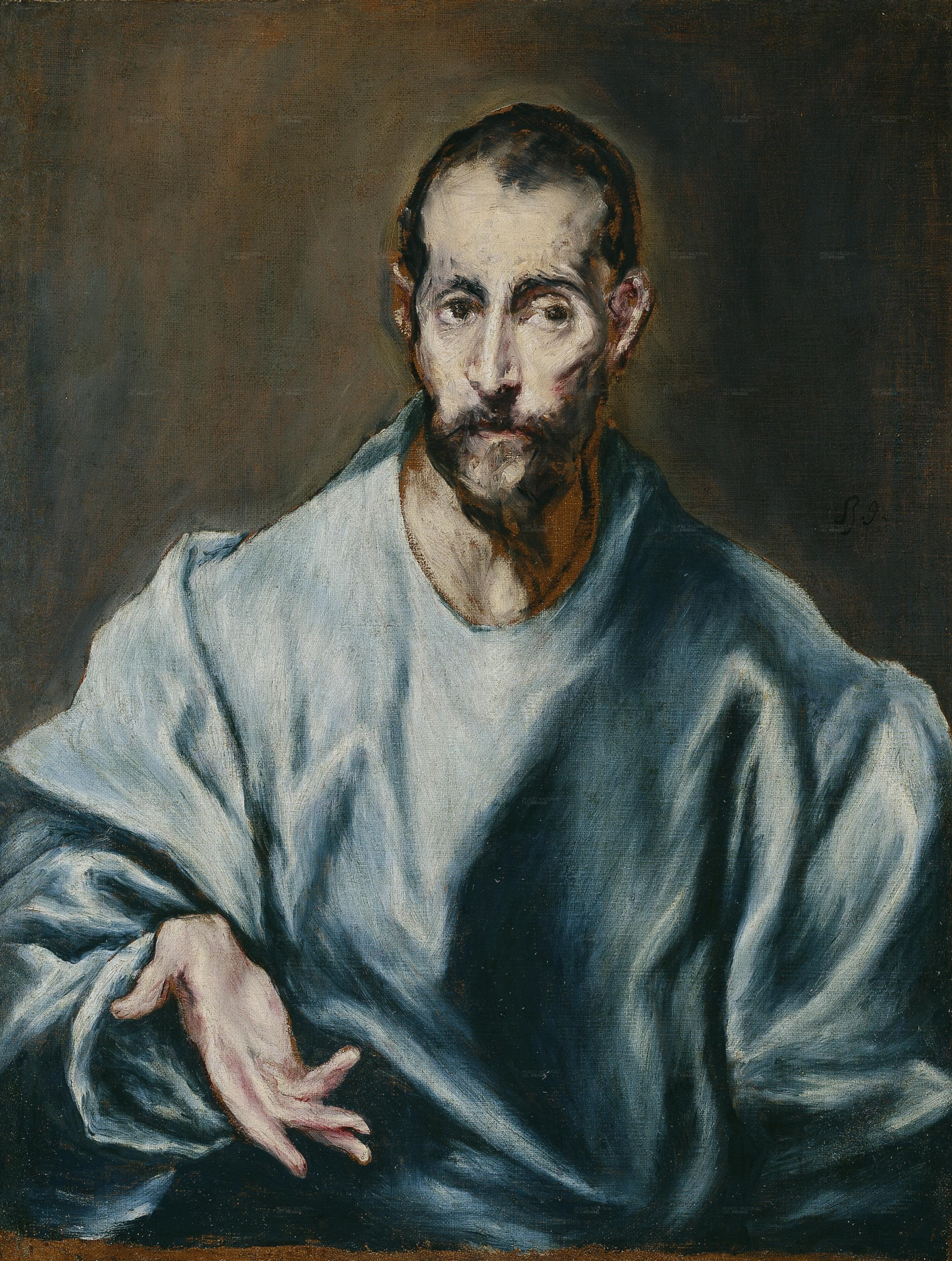
- Artist: El Greco
- Year: 1610
- Medium: oil on canvas
- Dimensions: 72 cm × 55 cm (28 in × 22 in)
- Location: Museo del Prado, Madrid

Saint James the Great is a 1610 painting of James the Great by El Greco, now in the Museo del Prado. The painting is key to Gregorio Marañón's theory that the painter used mental patients at the Hospital del Nuncio as models.

It originally formed part of a series of works produced by the artist for the parish church in Almadrones, Spain, a series which represented a set of variants on a set of paintings of the apostles for Toledo Cathedral.

== See also ==
- List of works by El Greco

== Bibliography (in Spanish) ==
- ÁLVAREZ LOPERA, José, El Greco, Madrid, Arlanza, 2005, Biblioteca «Descubrir el Arte», (colección «Grandes maestros»). ISBN 84-9550-344-1.
- SCHOLZ-HÄNSEL, Michael, El Greco, Colonia, Taschen, 2003. ISBN 978-3-8228-3173-1.
- http://www.museodelprado.es/coleccion/galeria-on-line/galeria-on-line/obra/santiago/
- https://web.archive.org/web/20110519074858/http://www.artehistoria.jcyl.es/genios/cuadros/6417.htm
