= Saint Paul (El Greco) =

Painting by El Greco

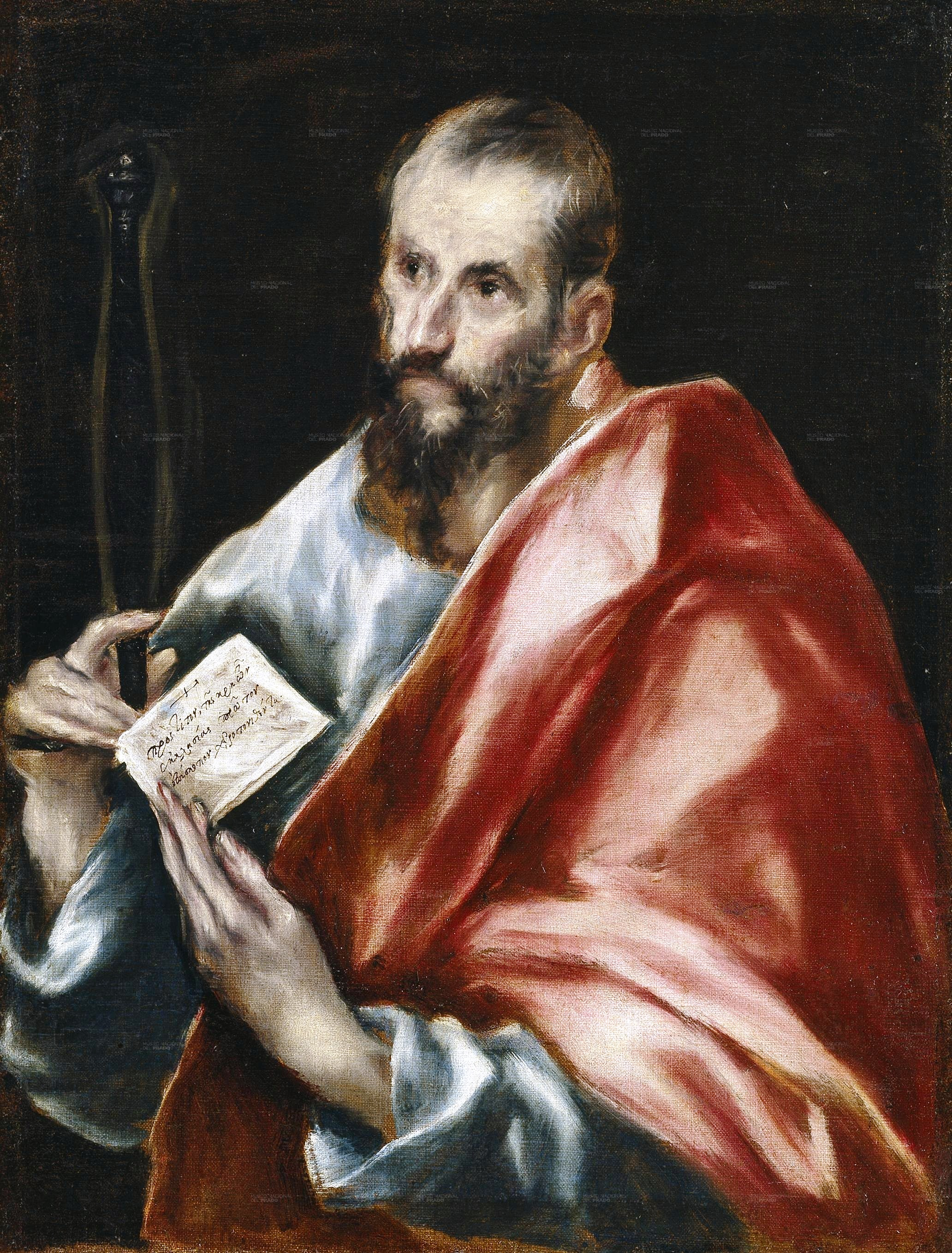
- Artist: El Greco
- Year: 1610-1614
- Medium: oil on canvas
- Dimensions: 72 cm × 55 cm (28 in × 22 in)
- Location: Museo del Prado, Madrid

Saint Paul is a 1610-1614 painting by El Greco, now in the Museo del Prado in Madrid. The painting is key to Gregorio Marañón's theory that the painter used mental patients at the Hospital del Nuncio as models.

It originally formed part of a series of works produced by the artist for the parish church in Almadrones, Spain, a series which represented a set of variants on a set of paintings of the apostles for Toledo Cathedral. Although not one of the twelve original apostles, Saint Paul, the "Apostle of the Gentiles", replaced the disgraced Judas in both series.

The letter in his left hand is addressed to "Titus, ordained first Bishop of the Church of the Cretans", who was at one time Saint Paul's secretary.

== See also ==
- List of works by El Greco

== Bibliography (in Spanish) ==
- ÁLVAREZ LOPERA, José, El Greco, Madrid, Arlanza, 2005, Biblioteca «Descubrir el Arte», (colección «Grandes maestros»). ISBN 84-9550-344-1.
- SCHOLZ-HÄNSEL, Michael, El Greco, Colonia, Taschen, 2003. ISBN 978-3-8228-3173-1.
