= The Saviour (El Greco) =

Painting by El Greco

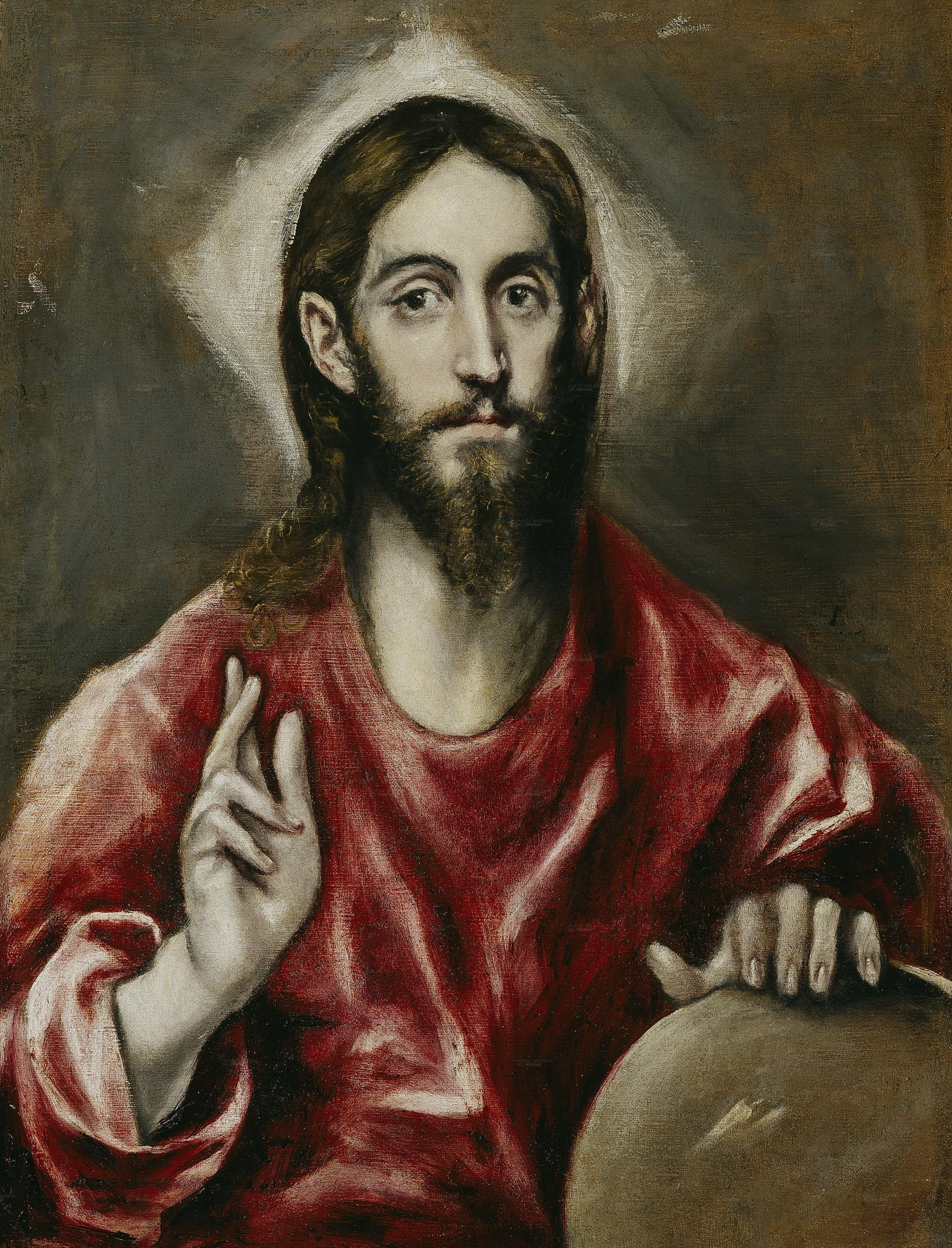
- Artist: El Greco
- Year: 1608-1614
- Medium: oil on canvas
- Dimensions: 72 cm × 55 cm (28 in × 22 in)
- Location: Museo del Prado, Madrid

The Saviour (Spanish - El Salvador) is a 1608–1614 oil on canvas painting by El Greco, now in the Museo del Prado in Madrid, Spain. It shows Christ as the saviour of the world, represented by the globe beneath his left hand.

It draws on the traditions of Byzantine art whilst also incorporating elements of Counter-Reformation painting. It forms part of a series of works featuring Christ and the 12 Apostles (an apostolado) commissioned for the church at Almadrones in the Province of Guadalajara, modelled on other works in Toledo Cathedral. Not all 13 works survived.

== Bibliography ==
- (in Spanish) Àlvarez Lopera, José, El Greco, Madrid, Arlanza, 2005, Biblioteca «Descubrir el Arte», (colección «Grandes maestros»). ISBN 84-9550-344-1.
- (in Spanish) Scholz-Hänsel, Michael, El Greco, Colonia, Taschen, 2003. ISBN 978-3-8228-3173-1.
