= Saint Thomas the Apostle (El Greco) =

Painting by El Greco

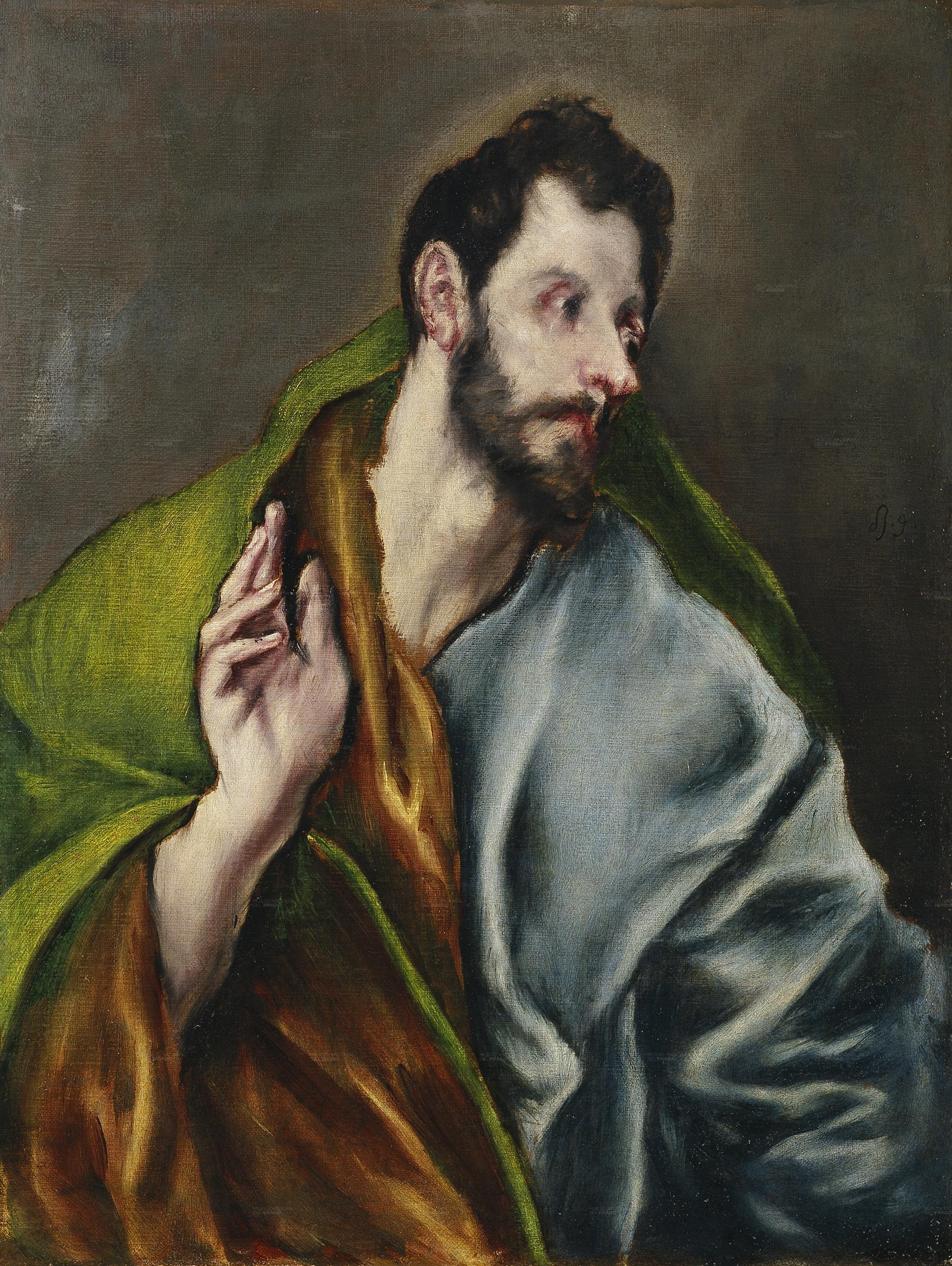
- Artist: El Greco
- Year: 1608–1614
- Medium: oil on canvas
- Dimensions: 72 cm × 55 cm (28 in × 22 in)
- Location: Museo del Prado, Madrid

Saint Thomas the Apostle is a 1608–1614 painting of Thomas the Apostle by El Greco, now in the Museo del Prado.

It originally formed part of a series of works produced by the artist for the parish church in Almadrones, Spain, a series which represented a set of variants on a set of paintings of the apostles (or Apostolate) for Toledo Cathedral. The painting is key to Gregorio Marañón's theory that the painter used mental patients at the Hospital del Nuncio as models.

== See also ==
- List of works by El Greco

== Bibliography (in Spanish) ==
- ÁLVAREZ LOPERA, José, El Greco, Madrid, Arlanza, 2005, Biblioteca «Descubrir el Arte», (colección «Grandes maestros»). ISBN 84-9550-344-1.
- SCHOLZ-HÄNSEL, Michael, El Greco, Colonia, Taschen, 2003. ISBN 978-3-8228-3173-1.
- https://web.archive.org/web/20120204020907/http://www.artehistoria.jcyl.es/genios/cuadros/6420.htm
