= The Apostle Matthew =

Painting by Anthony van Dyck

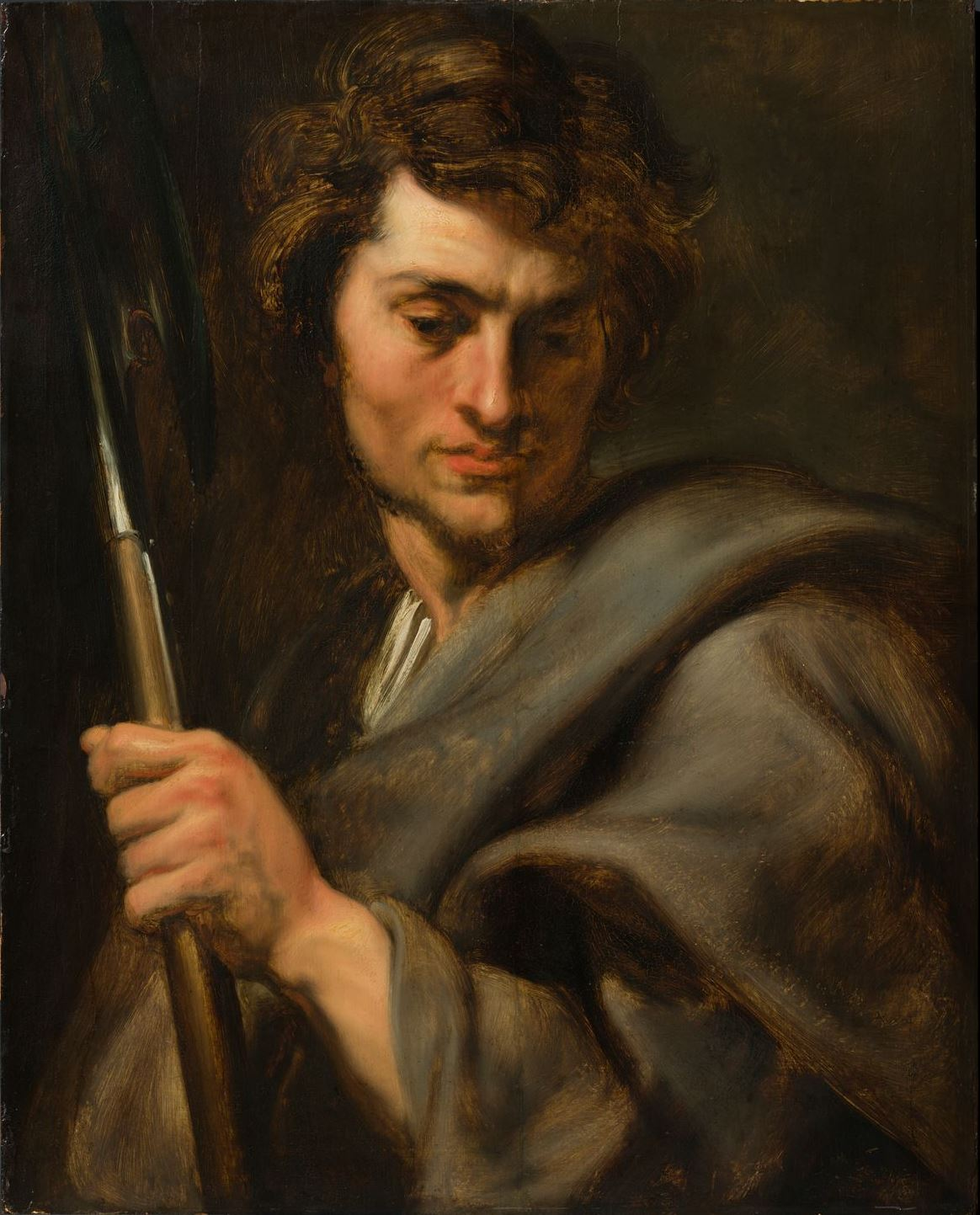
The Apostle Matthew (c. 1618–1620) by Anthony van Dyck

The Apostle Matthew is a c. 1618-1620 painting by the Flemish artist Anthony van Dyck depicting Matthew the Apostle. One of its inspirations was probably the series of paintings of the Apostles he had seen in his master Rubens' studio around 1610, produced for the Duke of Lerma. The smooth brushwork is consistent with the painter's other works from first period in Antwerp.

Around 1914 it and a series of other paintings were acquired from an Italian private collection by the Dutch art dealer Julius Böhler - together the paintings were known as "the Böhler series" after him, though he sold them separately to various museums and private collections.

In 2016, the current painting reappeared in the private collection of one Mrs Generet, along with a Self-Portrait by Jacob Jordaens. Both paintings were then donated to the Koning Boudewijnstichting, which decided to put it on long-term loan to the Rubenshuis, in Antwerp, making it the only painting of the series of van Dyck's apostles series now held in Belgium.

== See also ==
- List of paintings by Anthony van Dyck
