= Twelve Apostles in art =

Common subject in Christian art

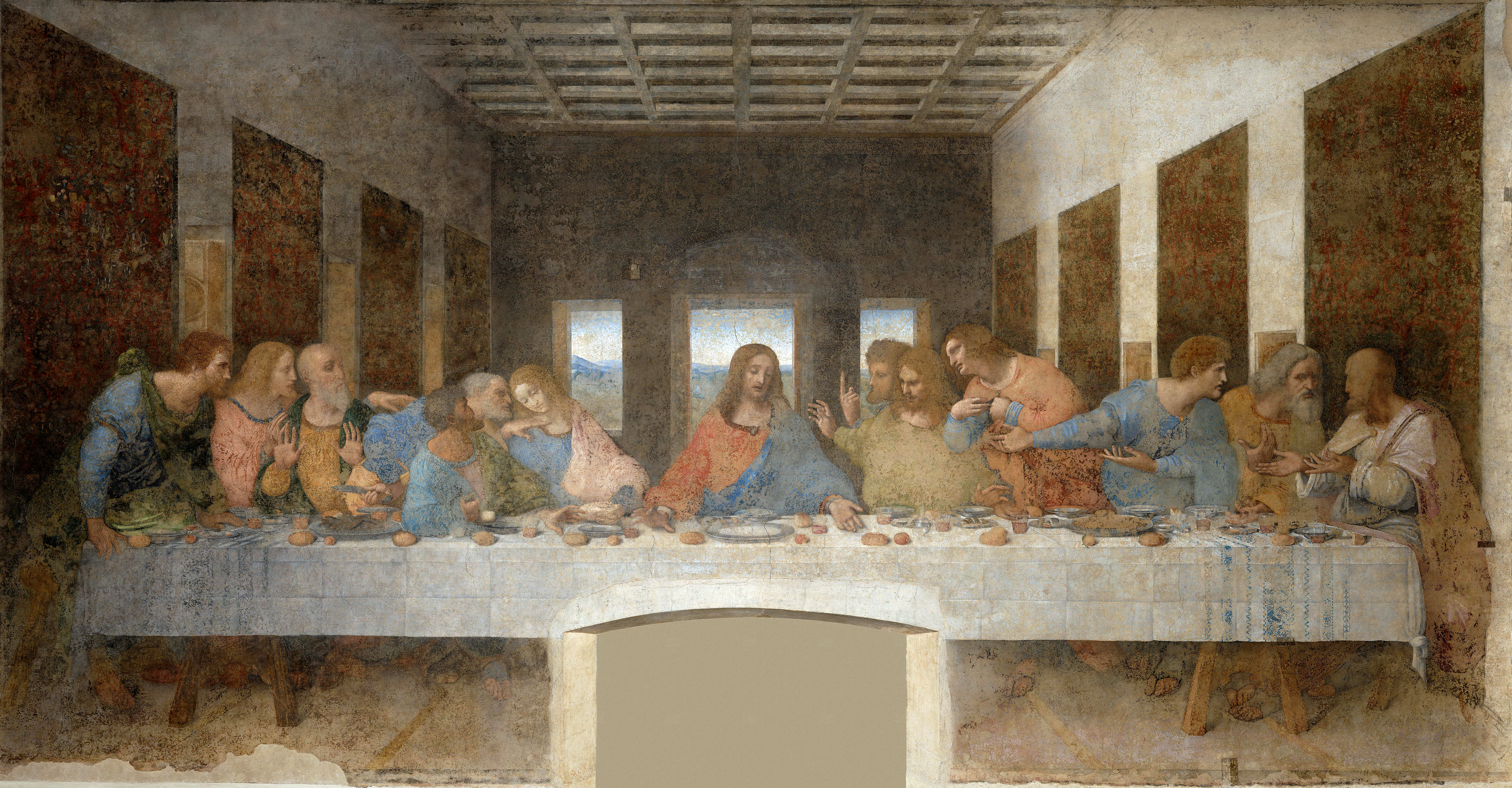
- Leonardo da Vinci's Last Supper (1495–1498)
- Apostles: Saint Peter, Saint Andrew, James the Great, John the Apostle, Philip the Apostle, Bartholomew the Apostle, Thomas the Apostle, Matthew the Apostle, James, son of Alphaeus, Saint Jude, Saint Simon, Judas Iscariot

The Twelve Apostles are a common subject in Christian art and serve as a devotional tool for many Christian denominations. They were instrumental in teaching the gospel of Jesus, "continuing the mission of Jesus" with their depictions continuing to serve as spiritual inspiration and authority. Many Protestant denominations reject religious imagery, including the veneration of the apostles and other religious figures.

Single portraits are common, or smaller groups, with the full group mostly seen in narrative scenes from the Life of Christ in art, especially The Last Supper. All the apostles acquired distinctive attributes enabling them to be identified, and the most important, such as Saint Peter and Saint John the Beloved, were given a consistent physical appearance. These, and the Four Evangelists, were the most frequently painted. The Evangelist portrait is a special type, used in luxury illuminated manuscripts to preface each gospel. Others were often included in altarpieces and other works because they were the patron saints of the parish, town or province, or of the donor of the work.

Some apostles had narrative incidents, especially their martyrdoms or calling by Jesus, which were depicted as distinct subjects. The Doubting Thomas is one of the more common.

== Early Christianity ==
The earliest depictions are mostly seen in this period through catacomb frescoes, sarcophagi and icons, with significant Graeco-Roman pagan influence. This was because it was mostly private worship in this period, before the adoption of Christianity in the Roman Empire by Constantine (306–337 CE), when works became more public.

The period used symbolism, influenced from pagan prototypes, in narrative scenes to convey religious meaning rather than beauty, as well as themes of martyrdom, traditio legis (handing over of the law/authority of Christ's teachings), and traditio clavium (giving of the keys) with a specific focus on apostles Peter and Paul, as the ideal teaching figures in the transference of religious authority. The remaining depictions of the Apostles are relatively limited, especially from the Apostolic Age (c. 27–100 CE) and the Ante-Nicene period (100–325 CE). This is due to the lack of patronage and the privatisation of the worship of icons known as graven images.

The oldest known images of some of the apostles are in the catacombs of St Tecla in Rome, dated to the 4th century. The frescoes include Paul, Peter, John and Andrew, serving as a funerary devotional image, to protect the occupants of the tomb. One of the other earliest depictions is in the house church of Dura-Europos, in the baptistery room, from the 3rd or 4th century. It depicts Jesus and Peter walking on water, heralding Christ's power that viewers would hope to gain through "ritual initiation."

The period of late antiquity (313–476 CE), after the Edict of Milan (313 CE), saw an increase in Paleochristian public art, often focused on apostolic authority, due to Constantine's decriminalisation of Christianity.

They were typically depicted in Church works that were more monumental or in sarcophagi during this period. This led to a rise in the cult of saints and apostles as "relics and martyr graves became political instruments."

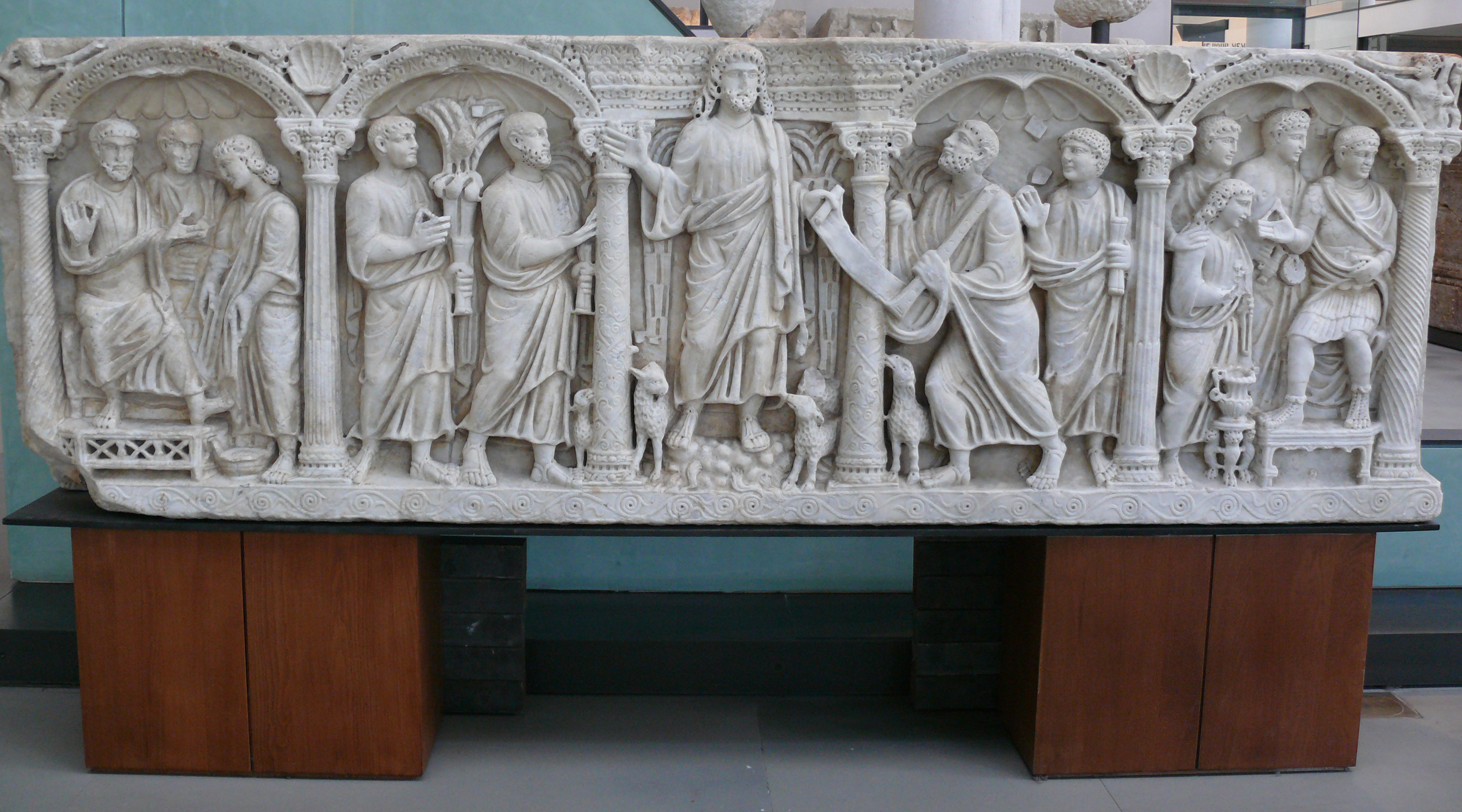
Marble sarcophagus depicting the law delivered to Saint Peter. C. 300–400

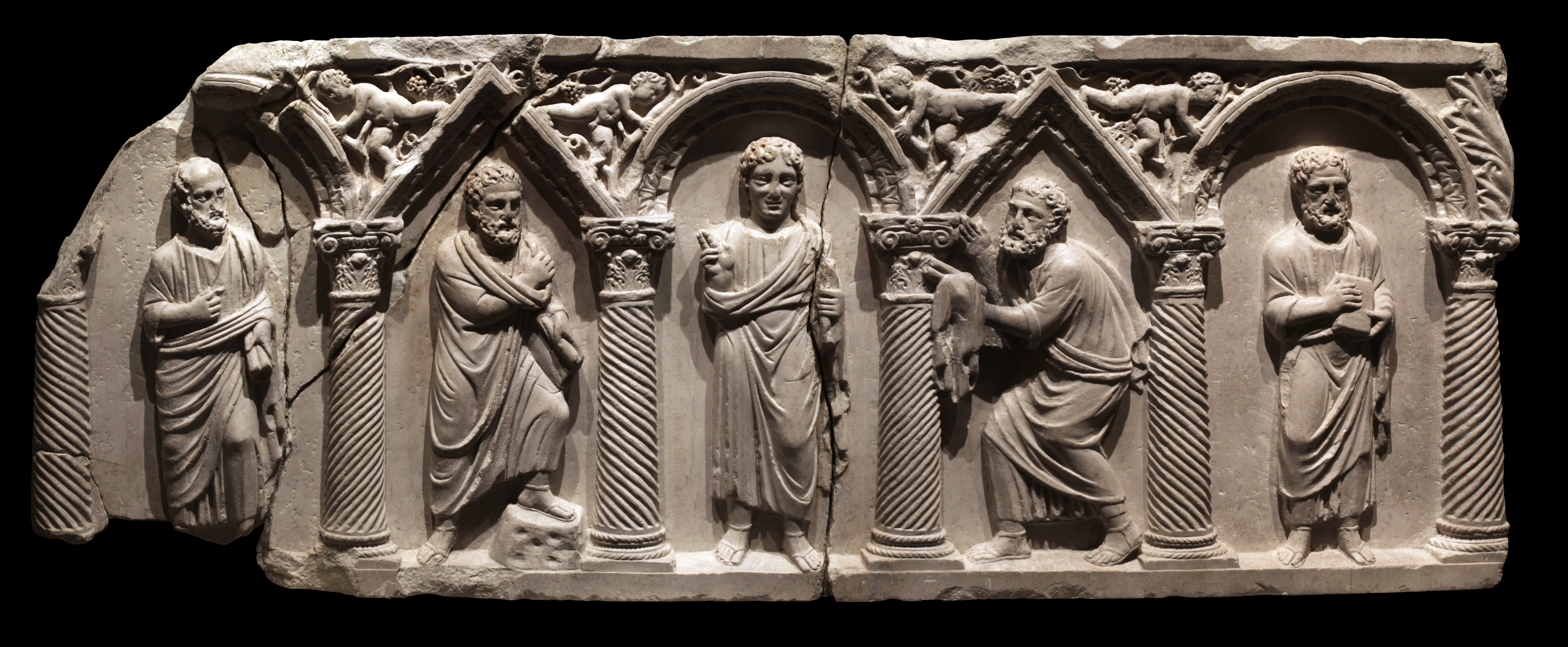
Paleo-Christian sarcophagus: Christ and his apostles. Genzano, Italy. c. 400.

=== Early symbols ===
The anchor was a common symbol linked to Peter and Paul, symbolising hope and often found in the epitaphs of catacombs like St. Domitilla. They were also seen with scrolls, Christograms and in an orans pose to establish their authority, sacrifice and connection with God. In the basilica of Saint Paul, the sarcophagus of the Anastasis displayed Peter's arrest, with a "cross, two soldiers and a Christogram," symbolising his martyrdom in reference to both Peter and Paul.

== Later periods (476–1750) ==
=== Middle Ages (500–1500) ===
With the fall of the Western Roman Empire in 476, the Roman Catholic Church still funded Christian art. Common media included sculpture, illuminated manuscripts, stained glass, metalwork and mosaics, fresco wall-paintings, tapestry, icons, sarcophagi and psalters or private prayer books. In the earlier periods, works were mostly served as a private devotional tools or liturgical objects such as chalices, phx's (containers for consecrated bread), situlas (bucket for holy water), Processional crosses and chrismatories (containers for holy oil). Liturgical tools were used in public rituals like the Eucharist, which was used to strengthen faith. The start of the Early Middle Ages was a period of political instability, poverty, and death in Western Europe, so public works were not widely commissioned by the church until later in the period. The beginning of the Middle Ages saw art using Graeco-Roman style before moving into the diverse styles of Byzantine art, Insular art, Pre-Romanesque, Romanesque art, and Gothic art.

=== Byzantine era (476–1430) ===
Constantinople's dedication as the new capital of the medieval Roman Empire became a Christian artistic centre during this period, with increased depictions of the apostles and greater distinction between their appearances. Byzantine art produced in the Imperial workshops of the Eastern Orthodox Church had a great influence over western depictions of religious figures, surpassing the traditional Graeco-Roman style.

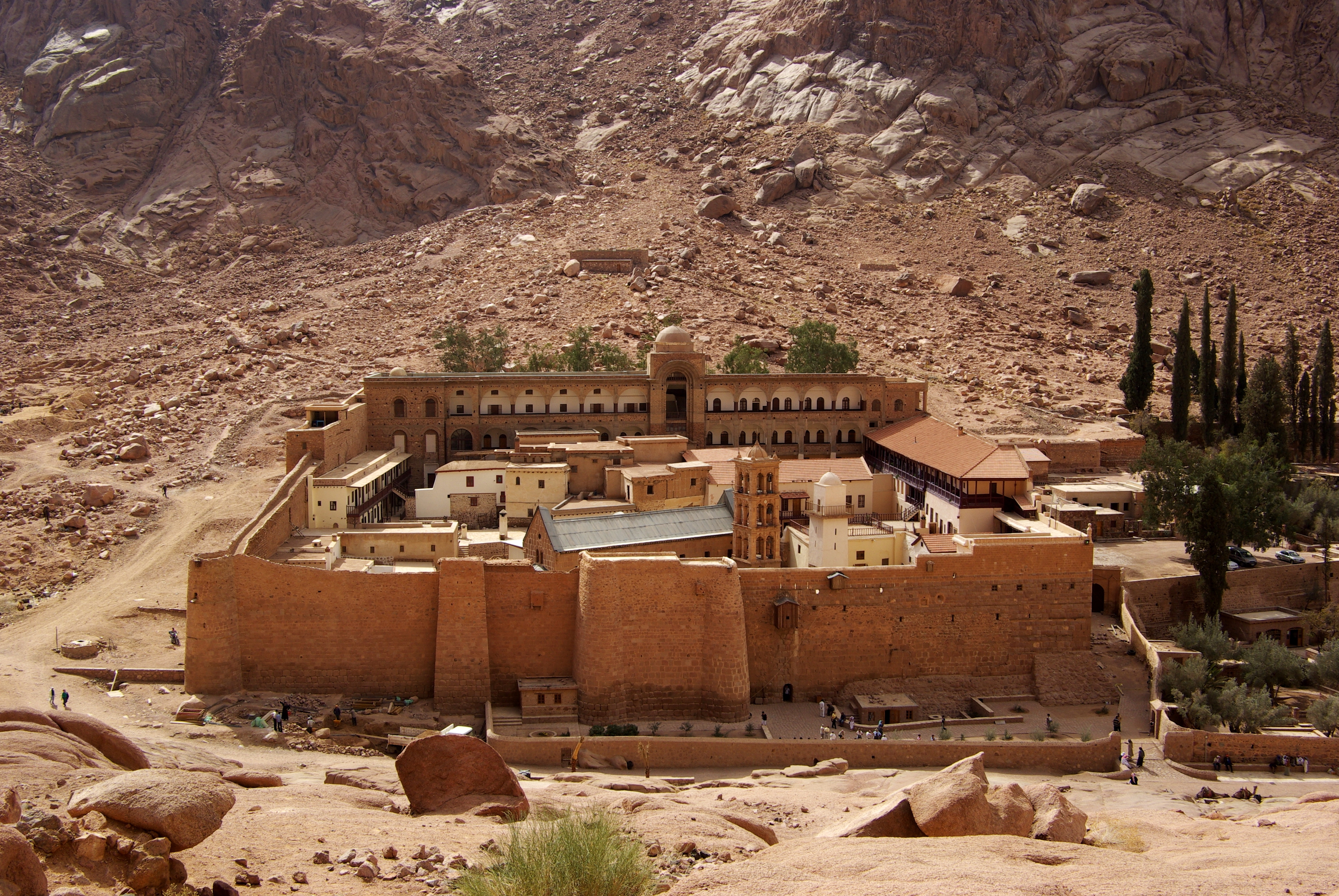
Egypt, Sinai, Saint Catherine's Monastery

Portraits were mostly seen in icons, some using tesserae mosaic tiles, and in paintings a gold ground. Icons of the apostles were mostly painted on wood panels with encaustic or egg tempera, but were also carved in stone and ivory and fashioned from mosaics, metals, and enamels. The portraits were highly stylised rather than earlier naturalistic ones, to display religious expression and veneration of the apostles. Byzantine images were mostly seen in churches that favoured flattened figures with standardised facial types which created other worldly images of the apostles, rather than human ones. Depictions in this period emphasised both narrative and symbolic art, to inspire faith of illiterate viewers. This period incorporated more expressive depictions than previous Hellenistic renditions of the icon to encourage the viewer to 'form a personal relationship to holy figures or by entering the narrative'.

The Church of the Holy Apostles in Constantinople featured these mosaics of the apostles in narrative scenes.This included scenes of communion of the apostles and the doubting Thomas story. One example is the Icon of Peter as a Saint in St. Catherine's Monastery, Egypt dated to the 6th century. The encaustic panel painting foregrounds Peter against his gold halo to display his divinity. He is also holding a cross - symbolising his death and martyr status. Later, the period of Byzantine iconoclasm saw an imperial policy that destroyed and banned icons within the period between 726 and 843, standardising and restricting later depictions of icons. Iconoclasm was a result of the fear of worship of the image, rather than the apostles or holy figure. Instead, the cross only was promoted as a form of decoration in churches. The prohibition against icons was due to verses in Exodus 20:4 which critiqued the worship of graven images. Most figurative images were destroyed or plastered over, with exceptions of images at the monastery of Saint Catherine on Mount Sinai, Egypt. Byzantine art style declined after the Fall of Constantinople in 1453.

Byzantine art

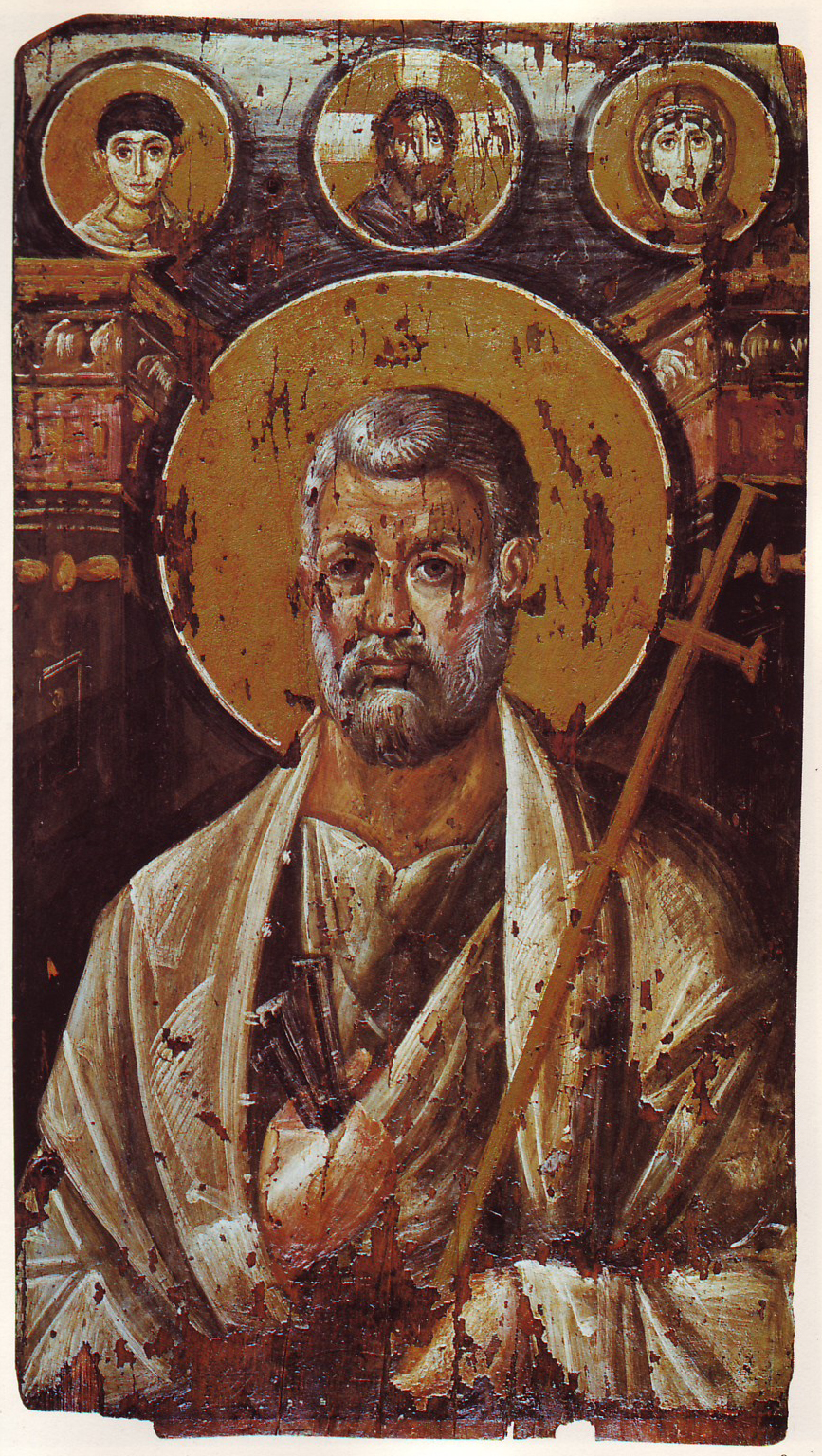
Icon of St Peter. St Catherine Monastery, Sinai, c. 600.

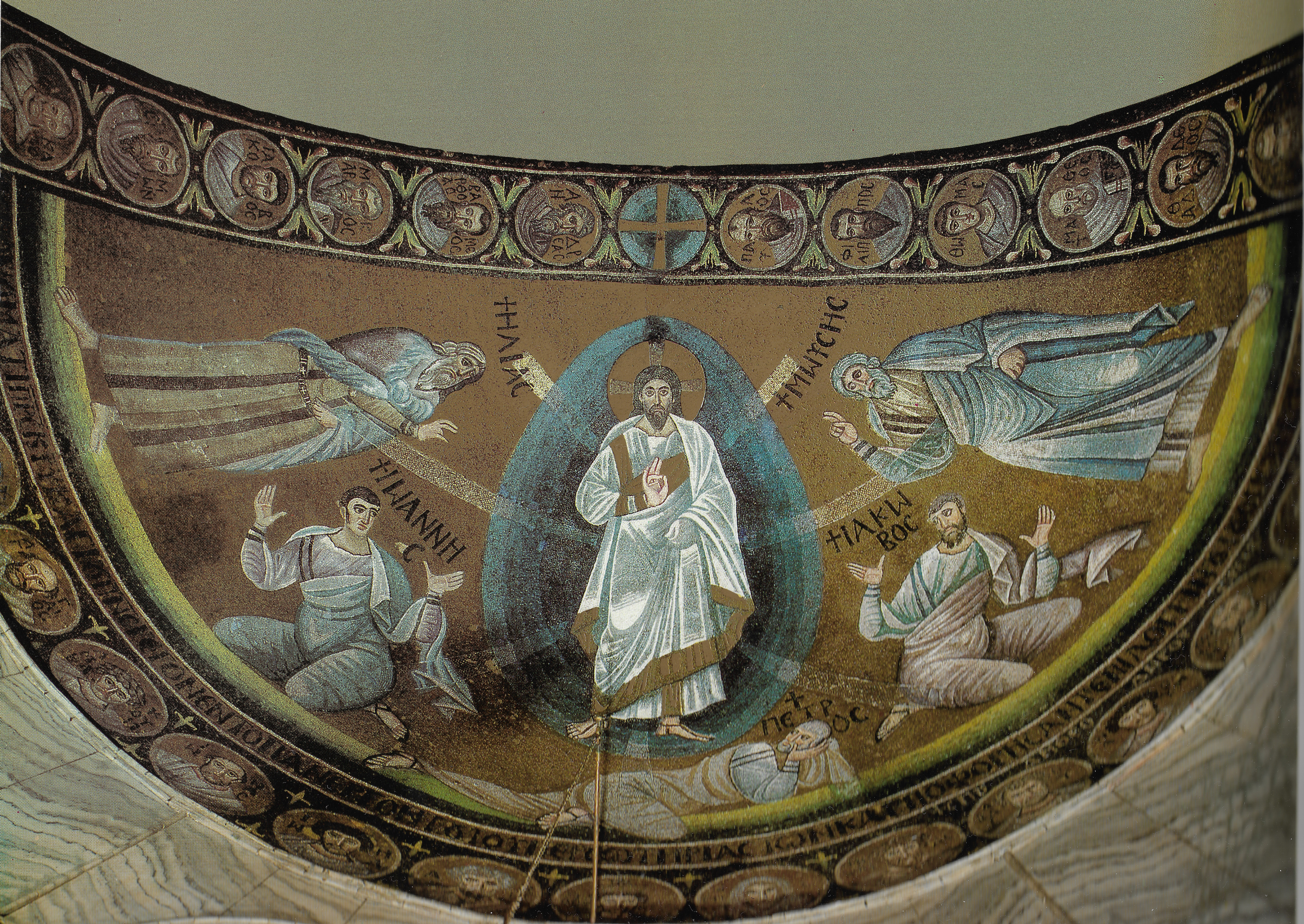
Transfiguration of Jesus Christ. Jesus appears in the middle between Elijah, Moses, and Apostles James the Great, Peter and John the Apostle. St Catherine Monastery, Sinai, c. 600.

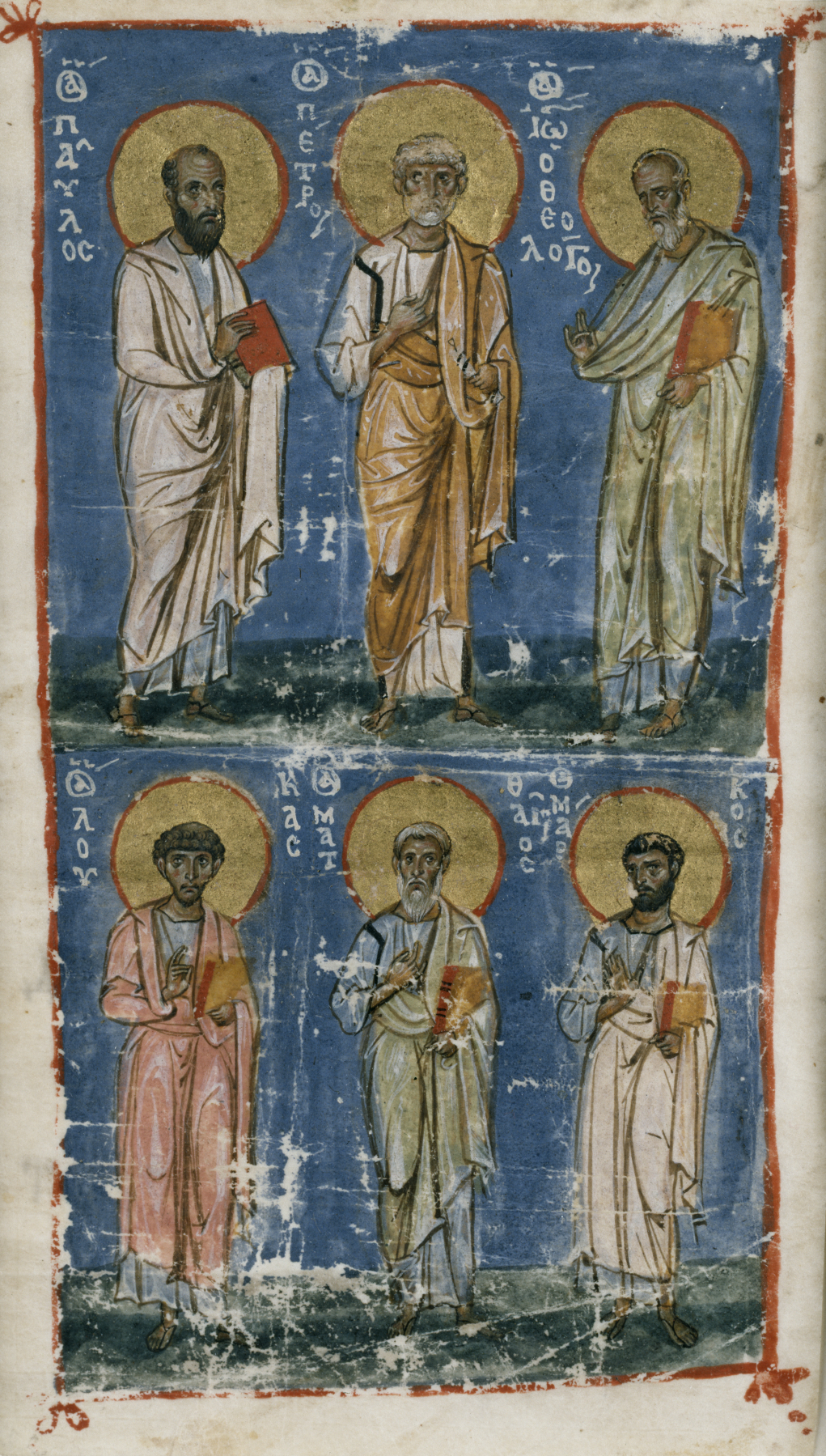
Miniature with the Apostles Paul and Peter and the Evangelists John, Luke, Matthew, and Mark. Constantinople, c. 1070 - 1100.

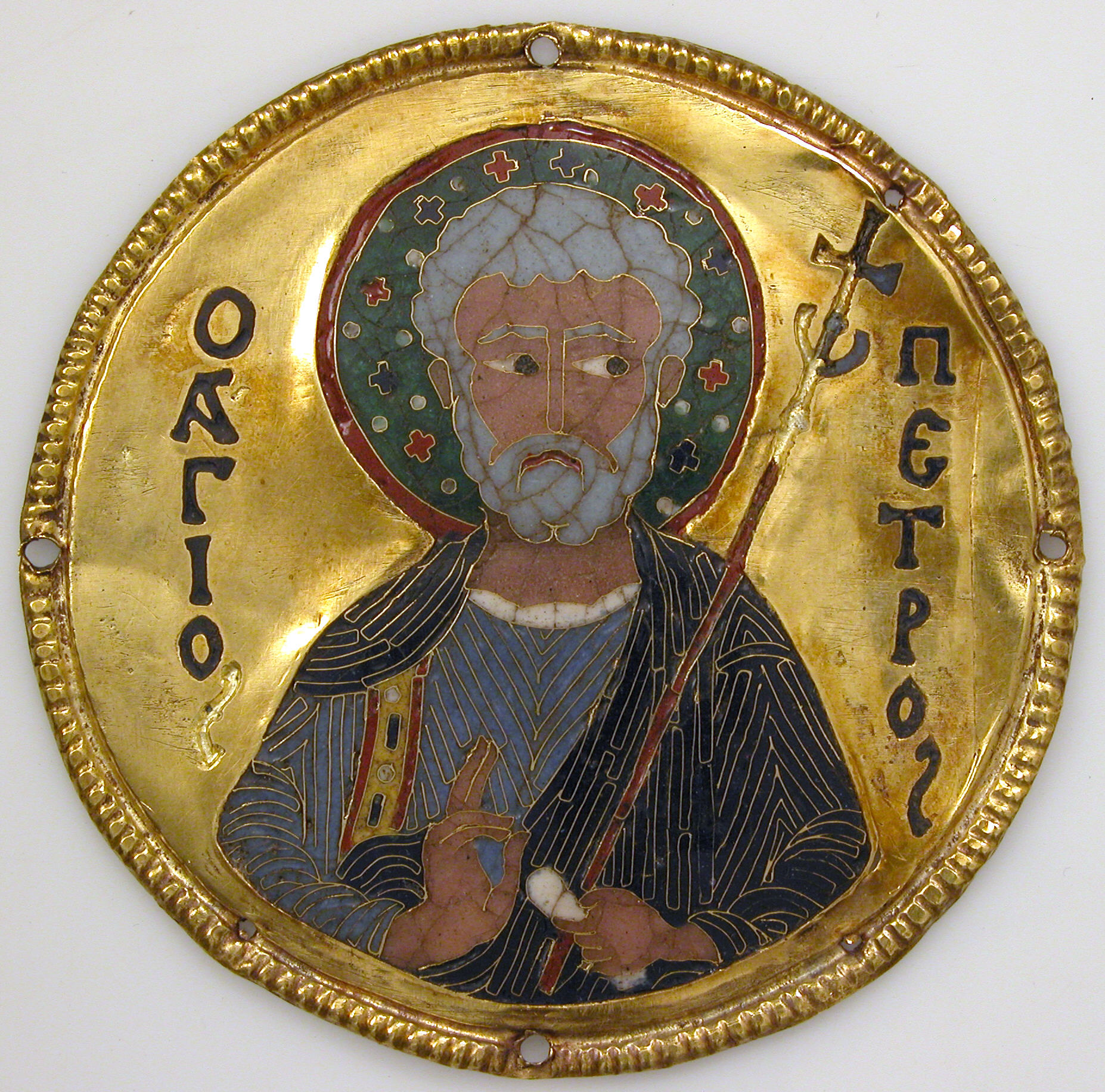
Medallion with Saint Peter from an Icon Frame. Constantinople, c.1100.

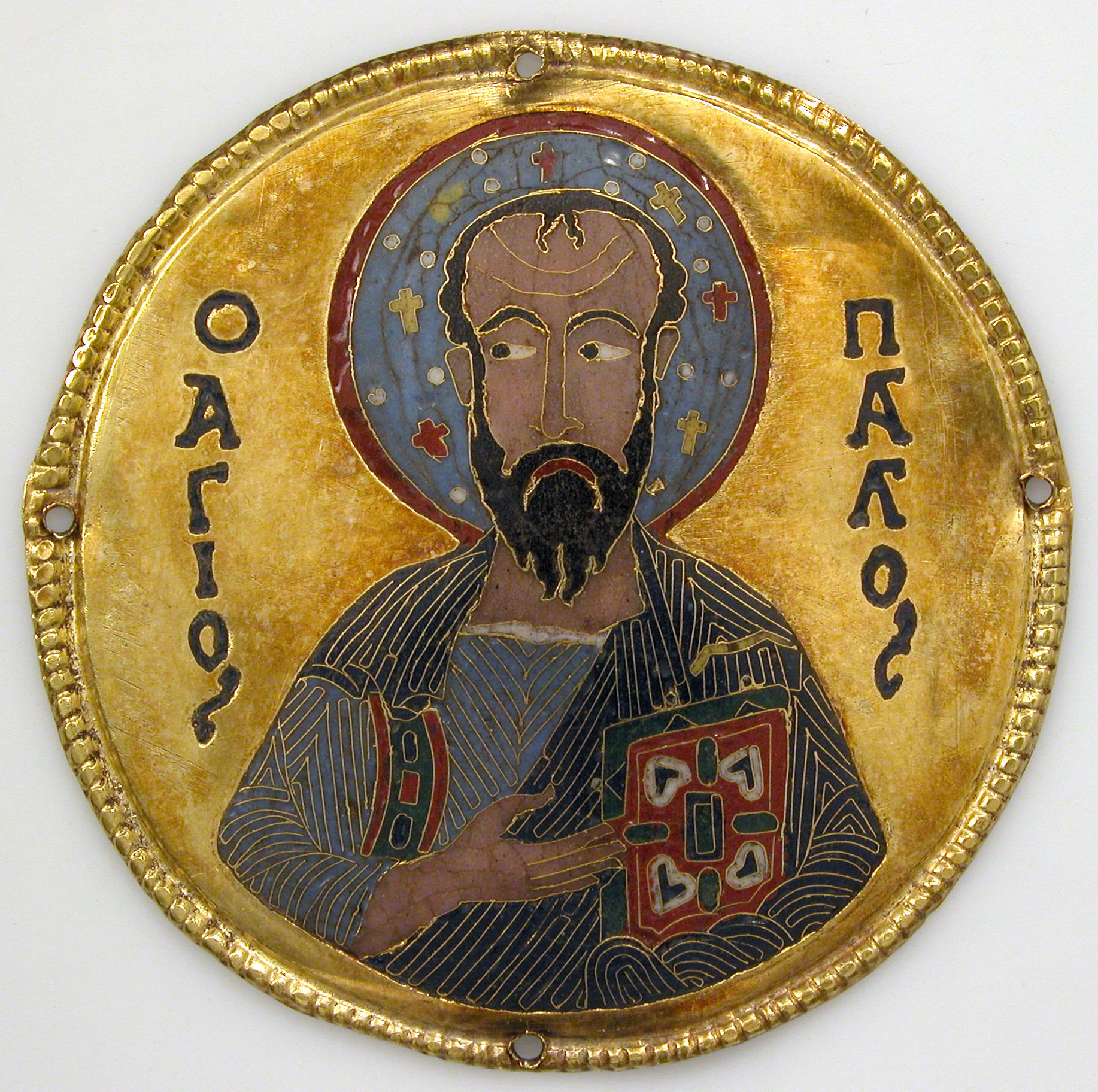
Medallion with Saint Paul from an Icon Frame. Constantinople, c. 1100.

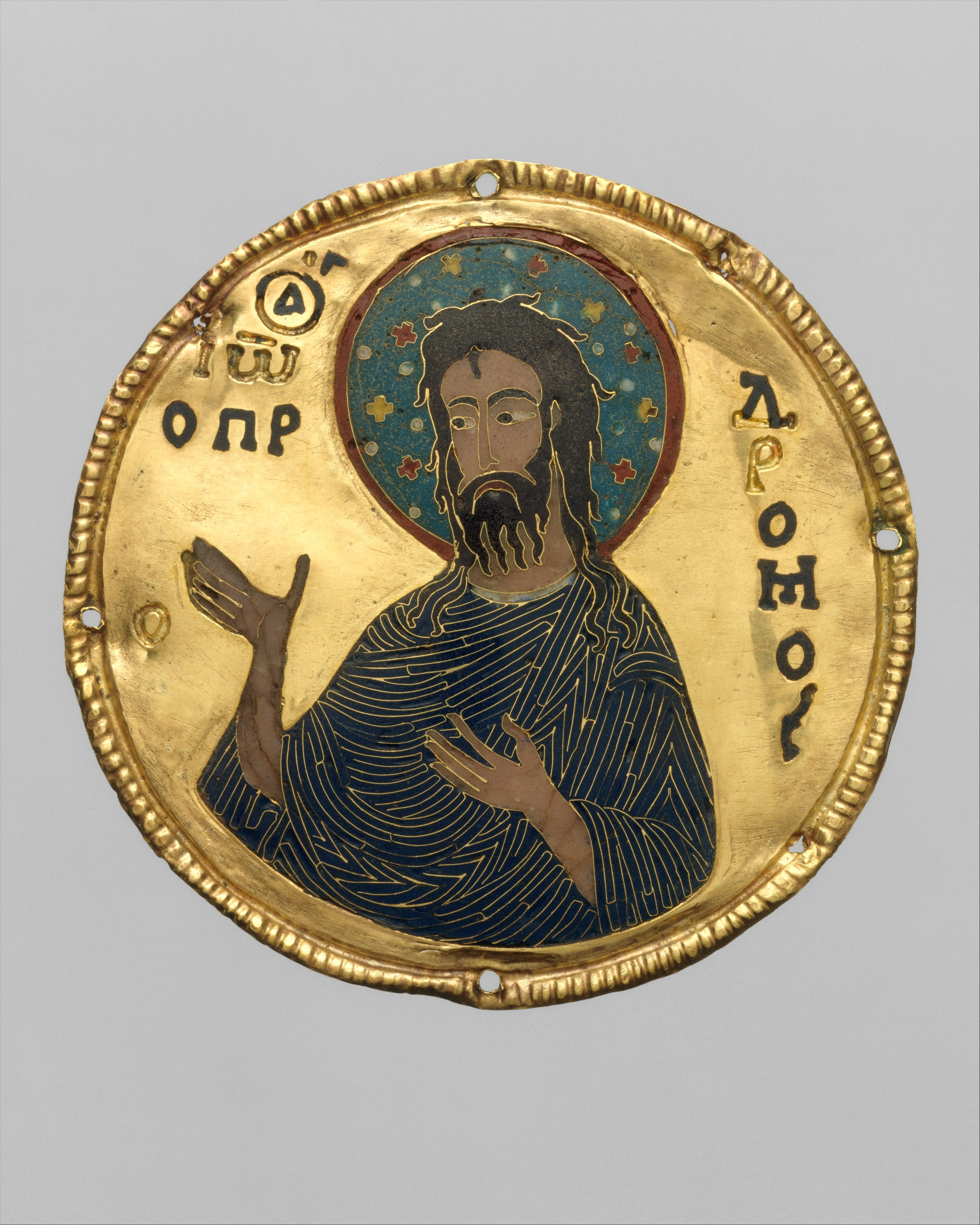
Medallion with Saint John the Baptist from an Icon Frame. Constantinople, c.1100.

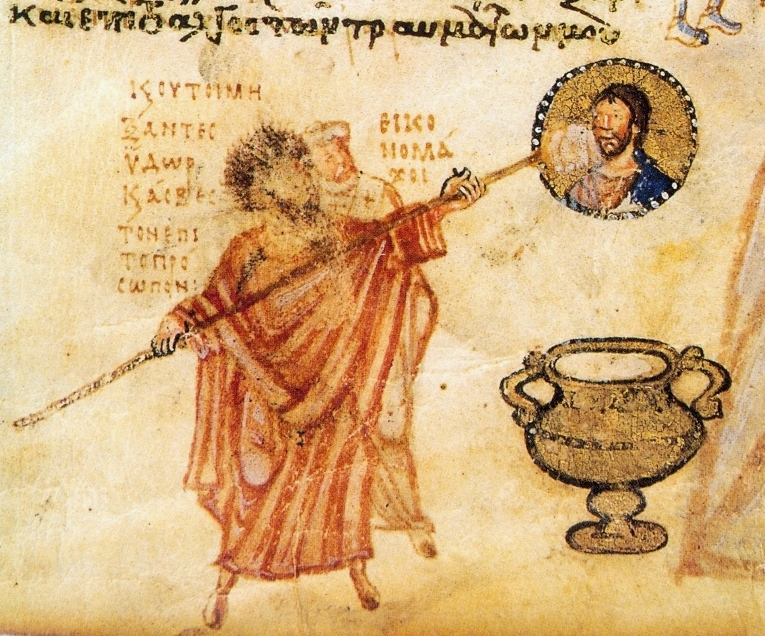
Byzantine iconoclasm. Chludov Psalter, Constantinople, c. 800.

=== Renaissance (1400–1600) ===
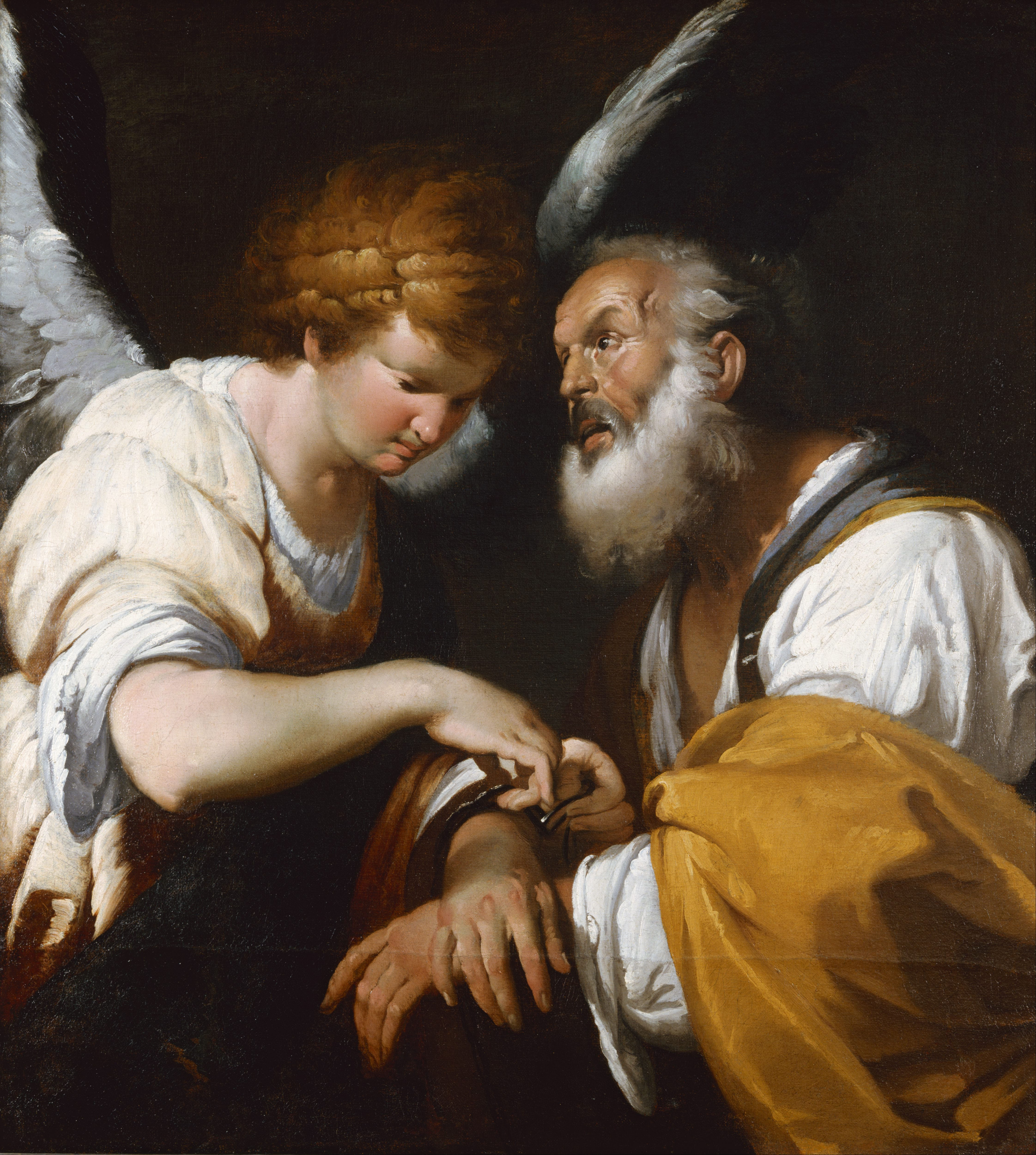
Bernardo Strozzi, The Release of St Peter, 1635

During the Renaissance, the Church sponsored apostolic portraits to make religion more accessible to the laity and those who could not read the scripture. The 'revival' period had a focus on the humanistic, individuality of man. This was reflected in the focus on anatomy, realism, linear perspective and chiaroscuro which made viewers feel more involved with the figures. Apostles were high privileged in this period as martyrs. They acted as a bridge between the divine and the mortals, as well as a tool by the Roman Catholic Church during the Counter-Reformation to forgive Protestant converters.

Famous works depicting the apostles include Leonardo da Vinci's The Last Supper (c.1495–1498), The Four Apostles (1526) by Albrecht Dürer, Incredulity of Saint Thomas (c.1601–1602) by Caravaggio, and Self-Portrait as the Apostle Paul (1661) by Rembrandt. The Protestant reformation, which argued the tenant of 'sola fide' or 'faith alone' against icon worship, lead to the Protestant iconoclasm of the 16th century destroying images. The Catholic church responded by commissioning religious art that was less grandiose, and more contemplative. In the counter-reformation the church often used trusted figures like the apostles to appeal to the masses, as seen in Bernardo Strozzi's Release of St. Peter (1635). Works incorporated stories of apostolic martyrdom to encourage viewers to return to Catholicism.

Famous works

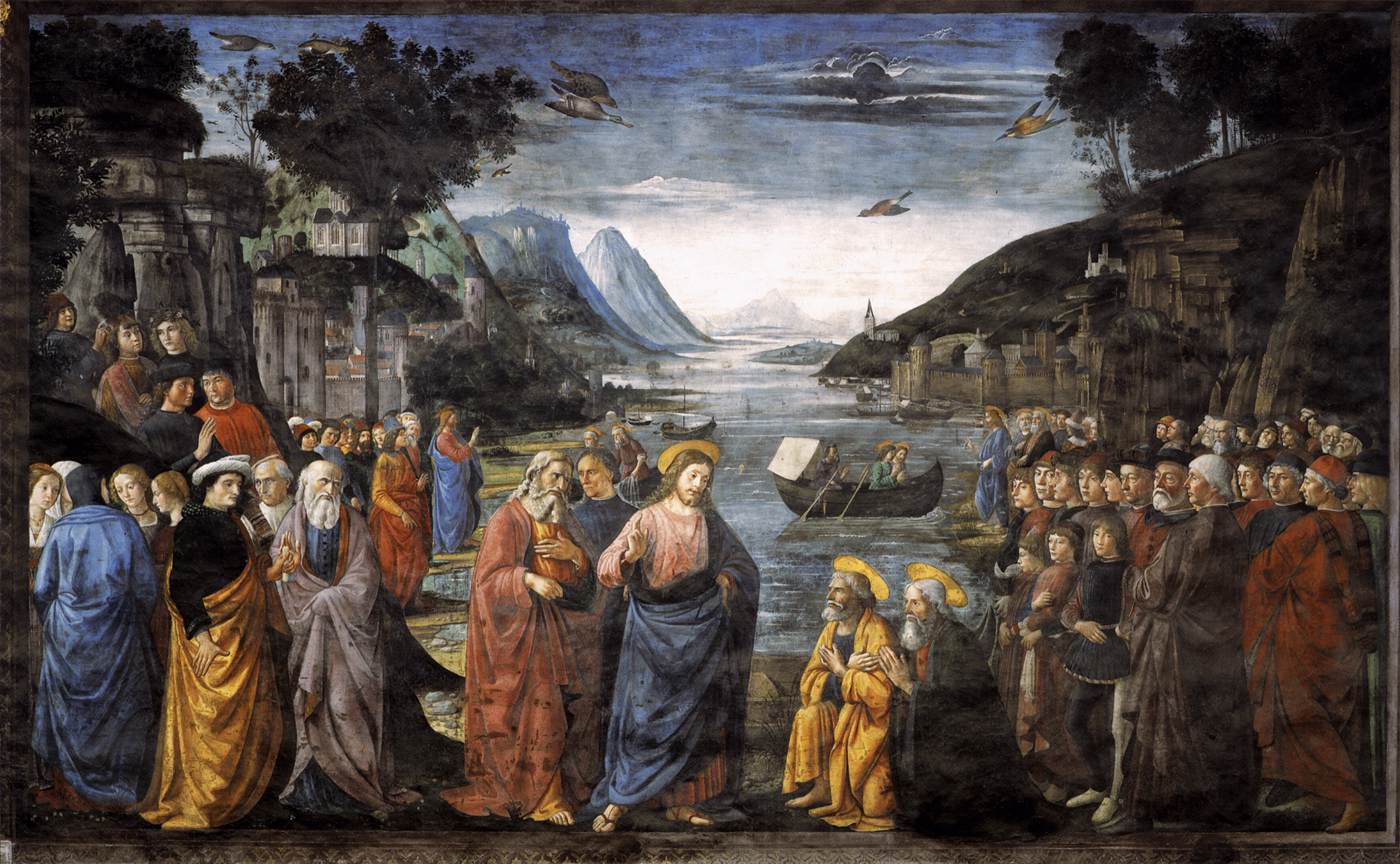
Domenico Ghirlandaio, fresco in The Sistine Chapel, The Vocation of the Apostles. 1481–1482.

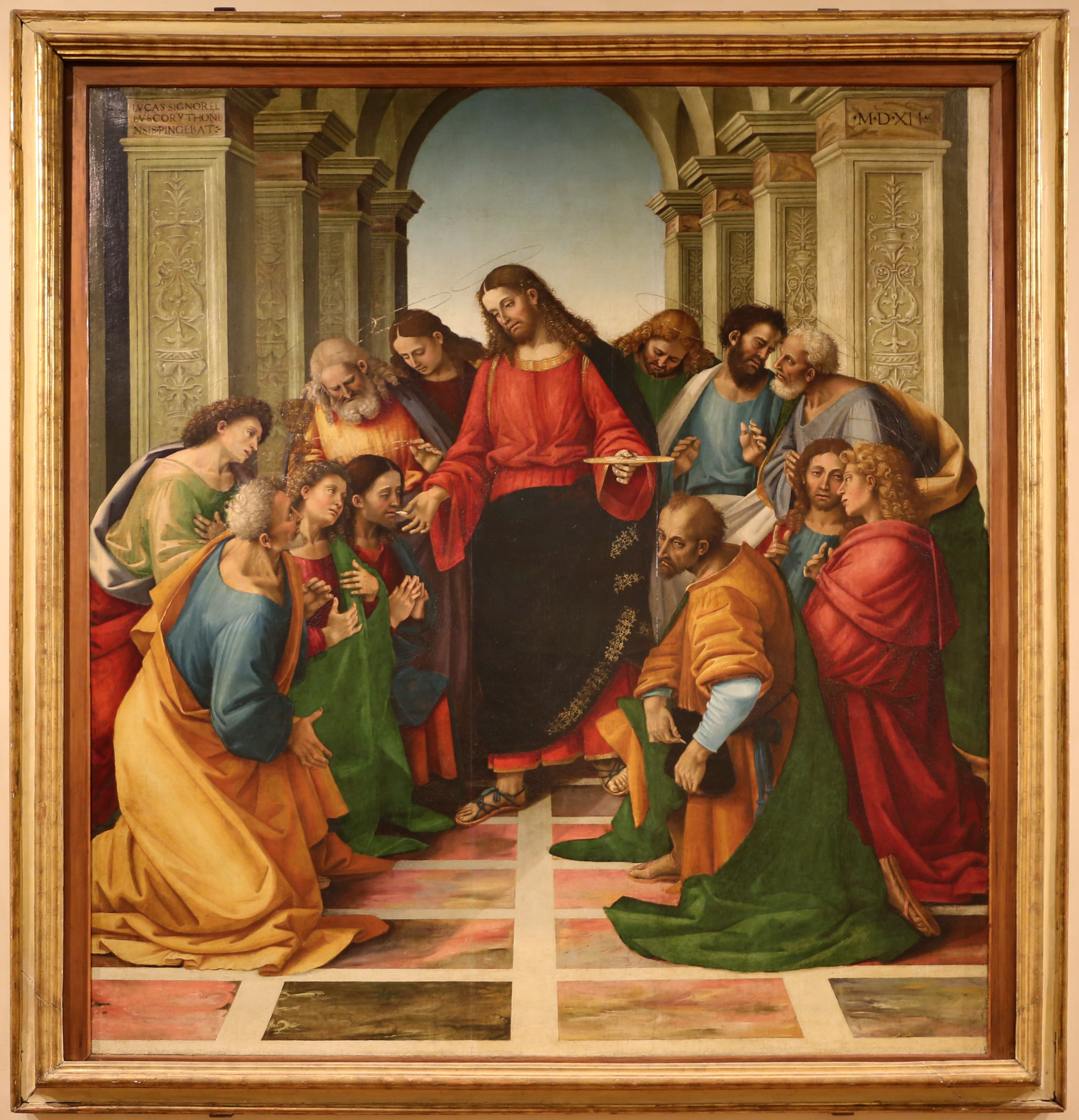
Luca Signorelli, Communion of the Apostles. 1512.

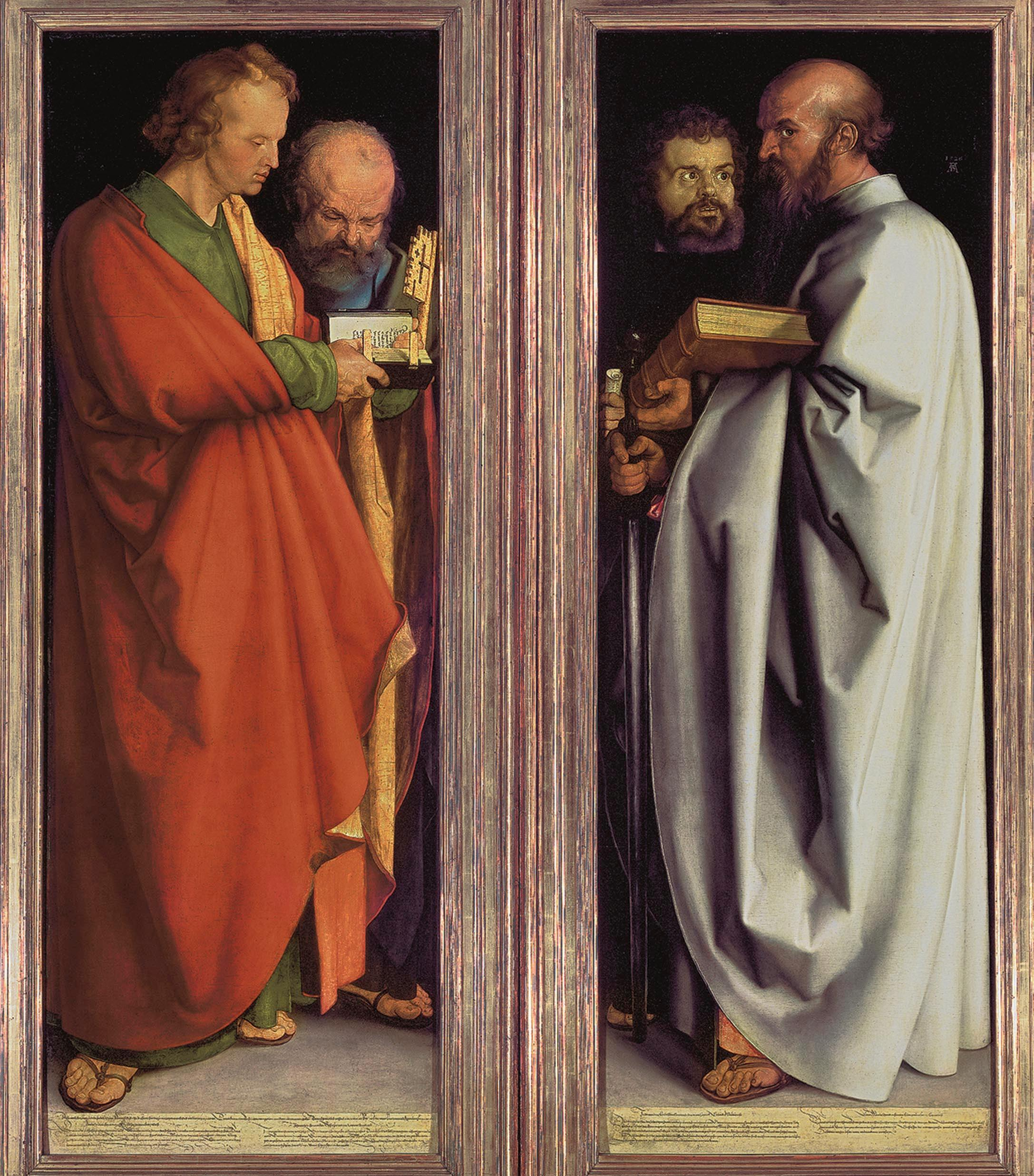
Albrecht Dürer, The Four Apostles. 1526. Features Peter, Paul, Mark and John.

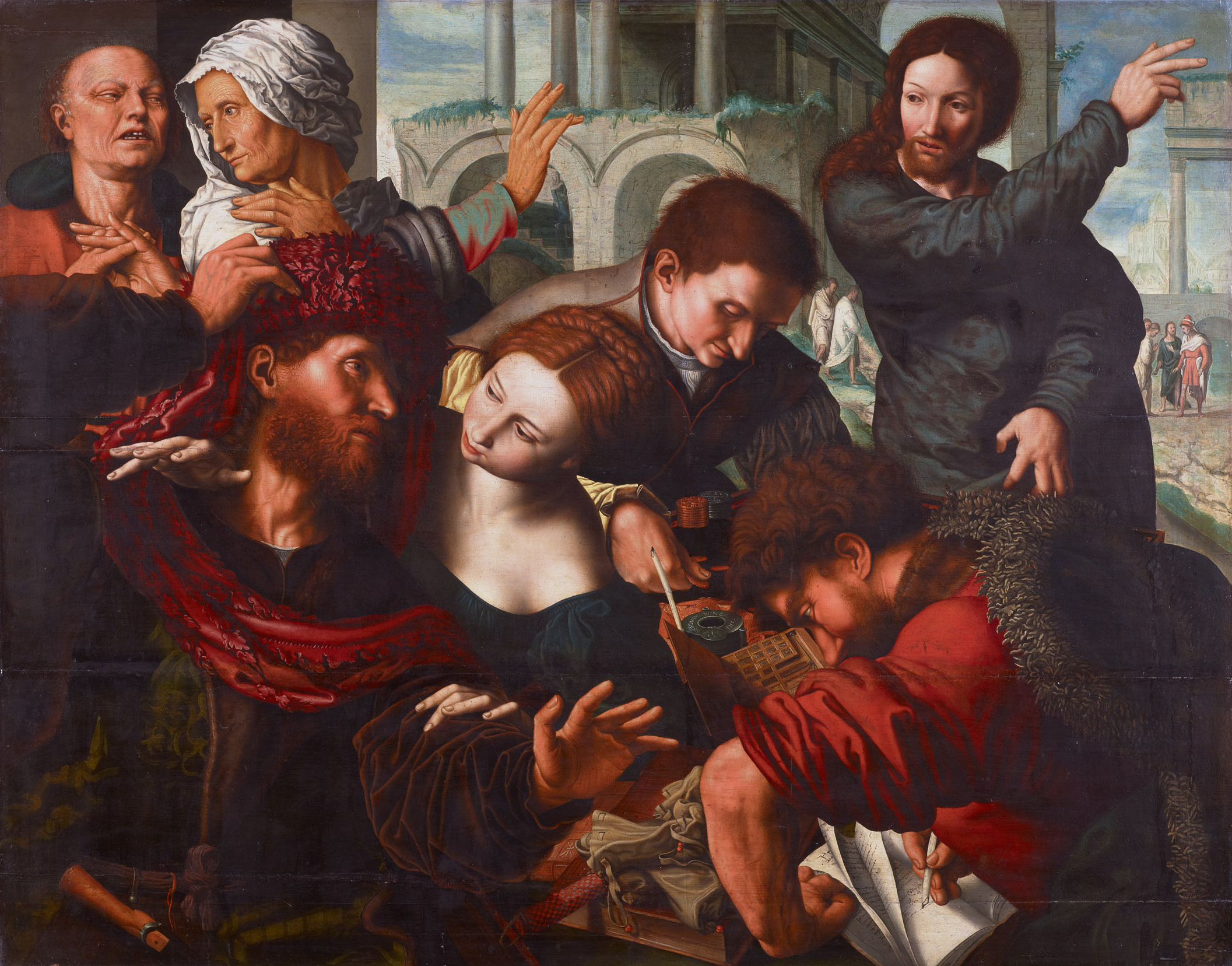
Jan Sanders van Hemessen, The Calling of Saint Matthew. between 1535 and 1540

Caravaggio, Doubting Thomas. c. 1600.

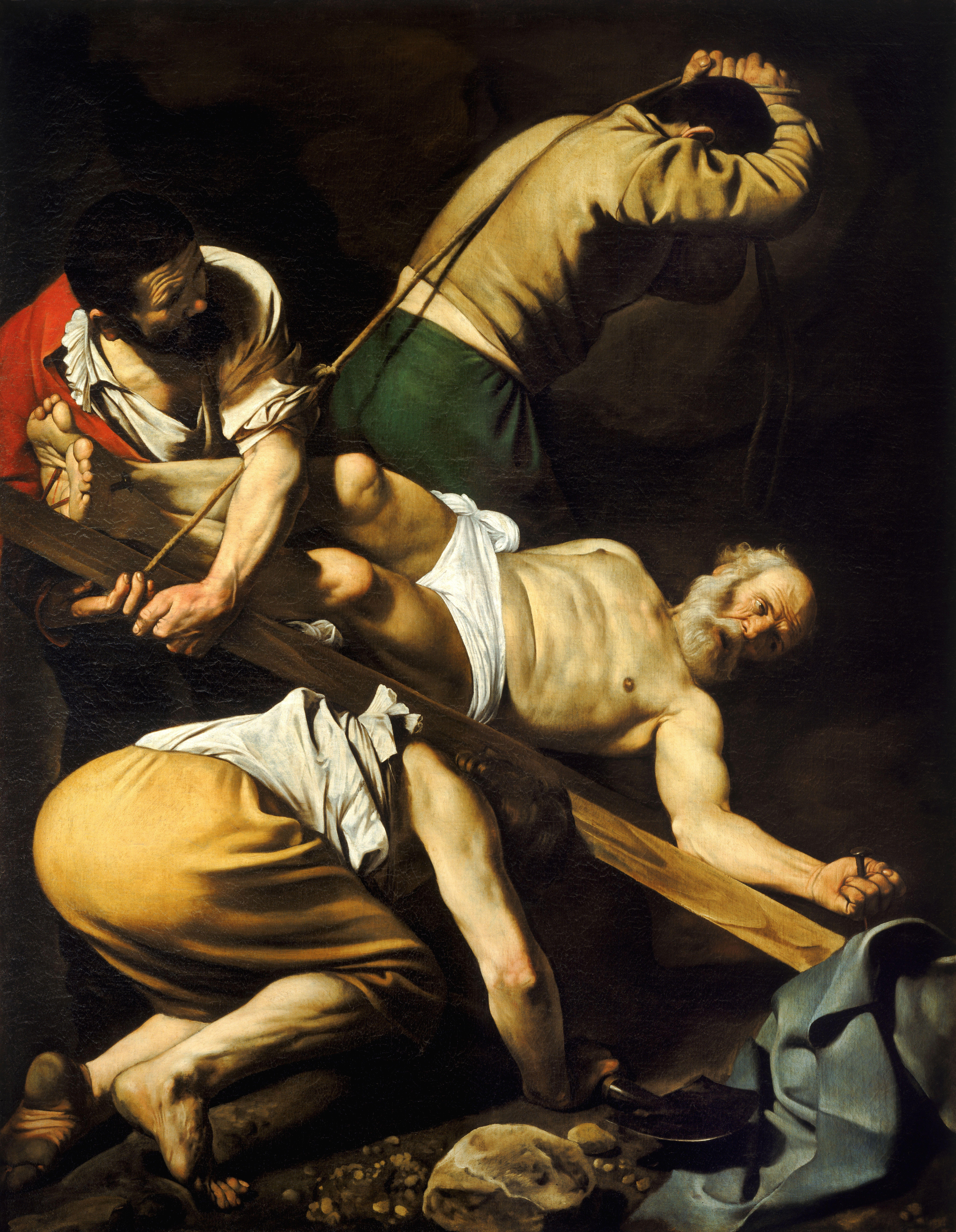
Caravaggio, Crucifixion of Peter. c. 1600.

Caravaggio, The Martyrdom of Saint Matthew. C. 1599–1600.

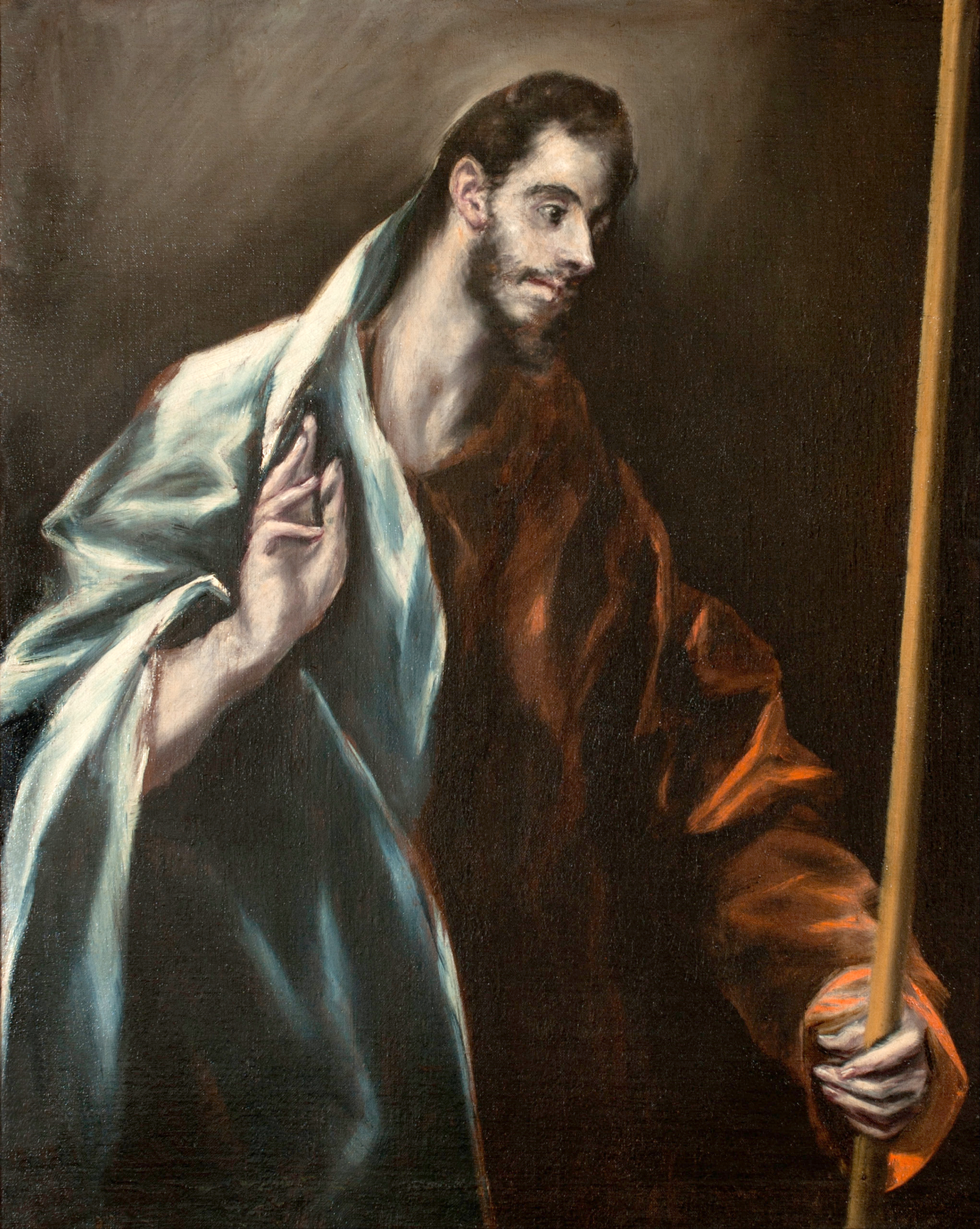
El Greco, Saint Thomas. c. 1612.

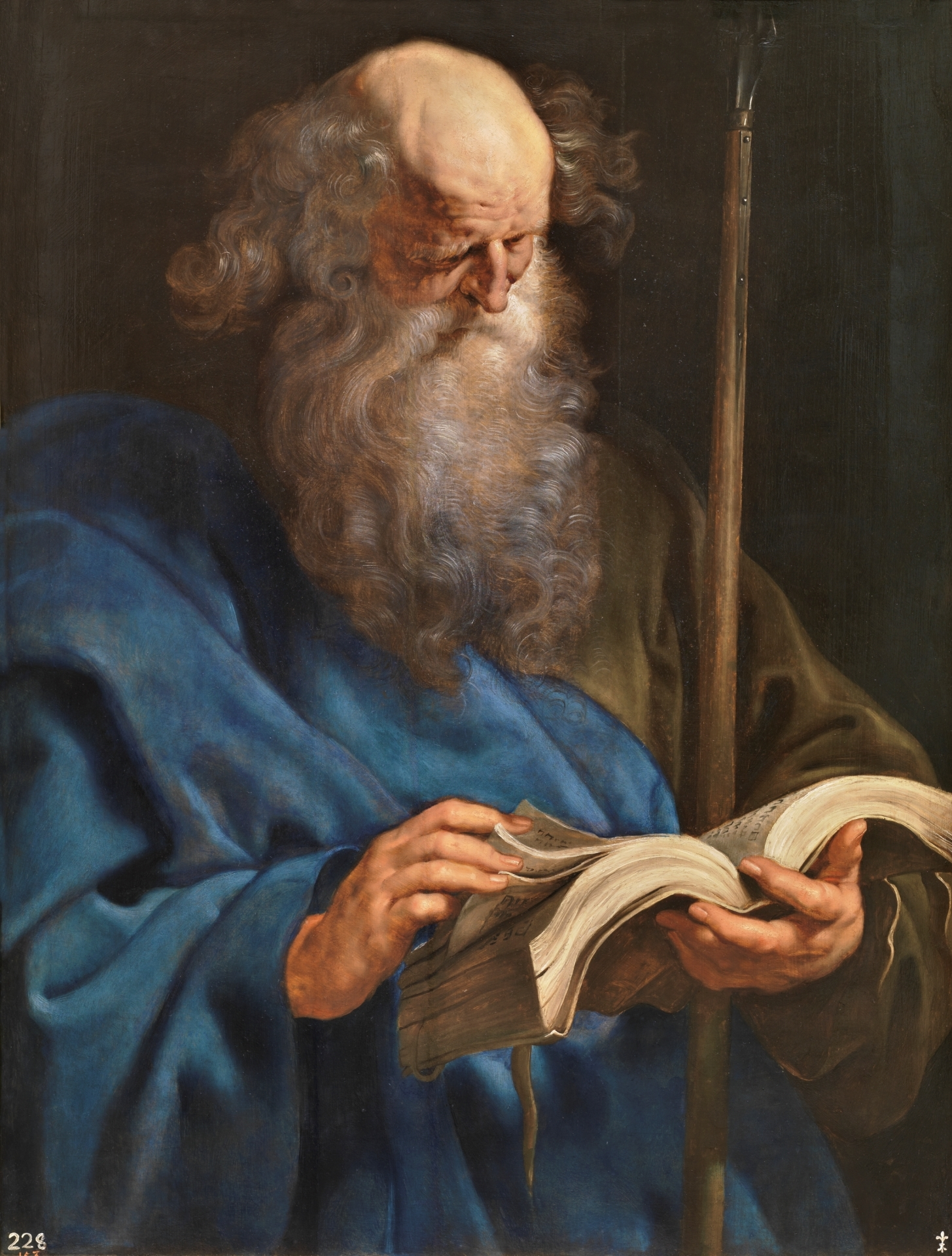
Peter Paul Rubens, Apostle Thomas. c. 1612.

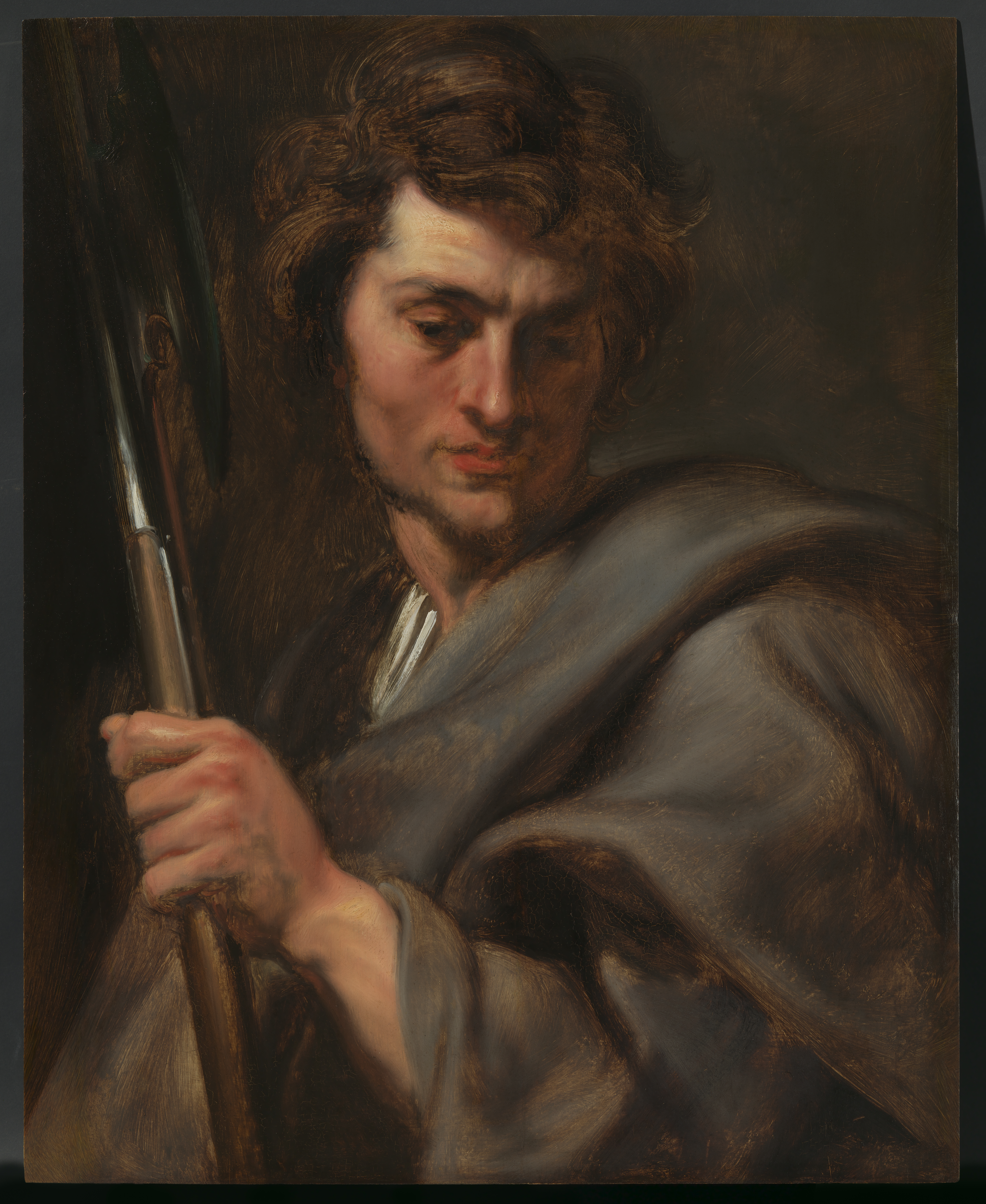
Anthony van Dyck, Saint Matthew. c. 1619.

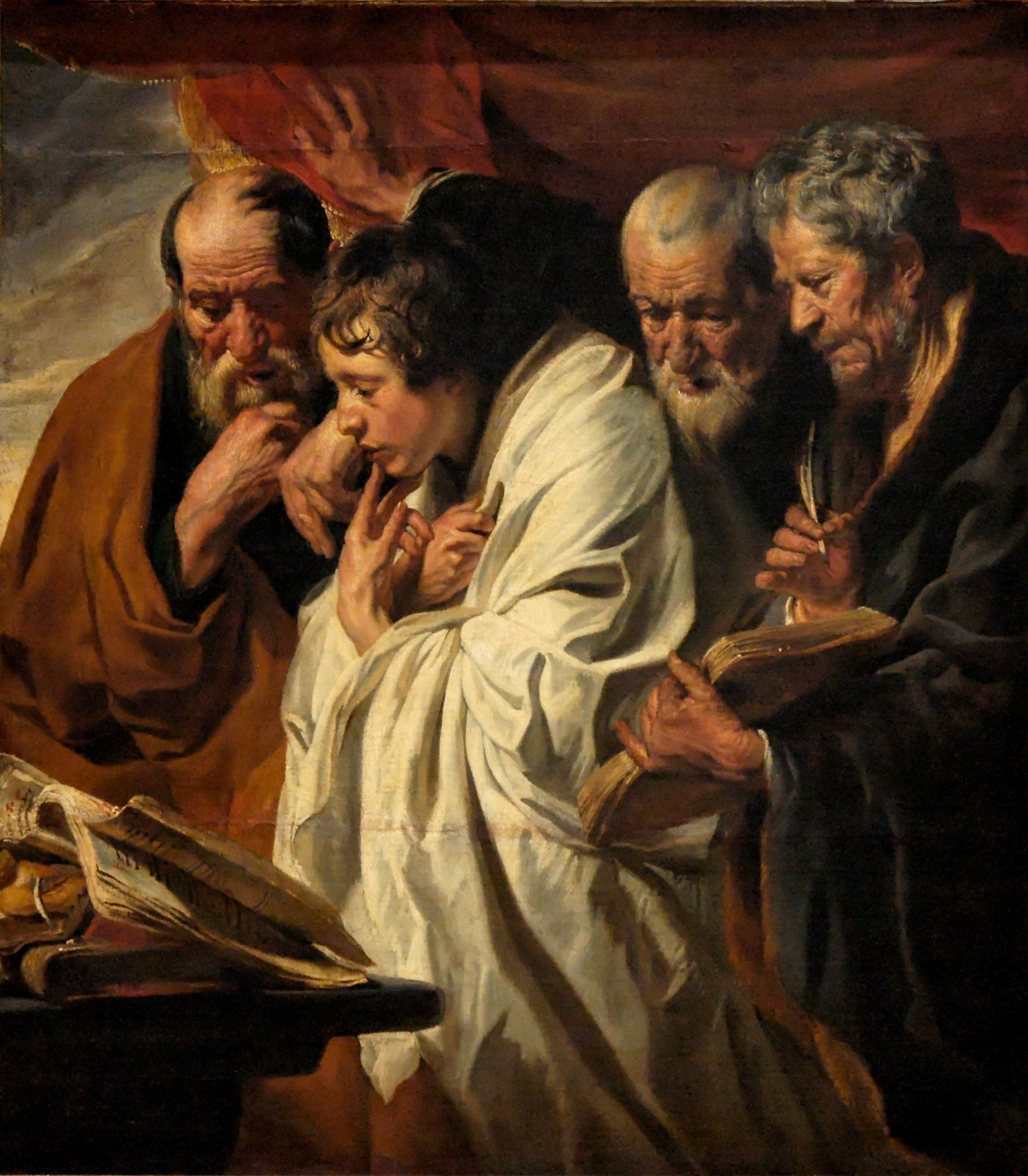
Jacob Jordaens, Four apostles. c. 1627.

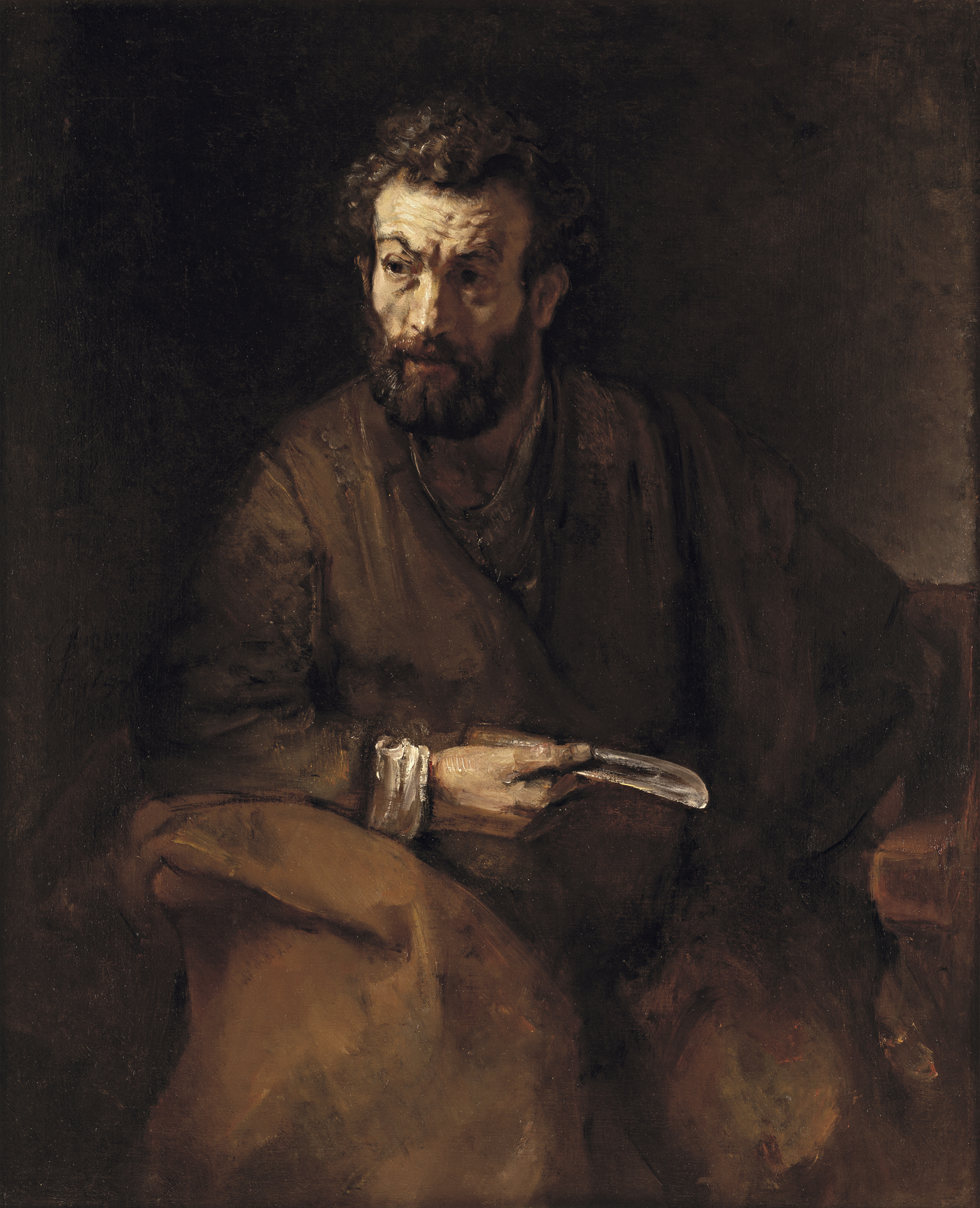
Rembrandt, Bartholomew the Apostle. 1657.

== Modern era ==
During the Industrial Revolution and the Age of Enlightenment, society became more secular and Christian art started to become collected for appreciation, rather than veneration. However, the creation of colour lithography popularised holy cards in the 19th and 20th century which featured the apostles among other religious figures. Contemporary works often portray conventional religious scenes, with modern revaluations seen in art, film and fashion in the increasingly secular society during the 20th century. In film, the reinvention of depictions of the apostles like Peter is seen in the film Mary Magdalene (2018). Some religious paintings have been well received, including Salvador Dalí's The Sacrament of the Last Supper (1955) which portrayed the apostles in an ethereal surrealist style, whilst incorporating Renaissance elements of mathematical ratios. However most religious conventional art depictions of the apostles have been restricted to devotional work within church settings. Other contemporary instalments of the apostles are often subversive and political. The Last Supper art exhibition in Brooklyn was created with "aims to fill the dearth of Black female voices at the metaphorical table."

Modern depictions been appropriated into fashion, including Off-White's collaboration with the Museum of Contemporary Art Chicago. The apparel included prints on hoodies and T-shirts of works like Caravaggio's Madonna of the Rosary, which features Apostle Peter. The exclusive pieces were sold in the pop-up store "Church & State" during Off-White's Chief Executors officer Virgil Abloh's exhibition "Virgil Abloh: Figures of Speech." The pieces featuring the apostles reselling for up to $2000 AUD.

== See also ==
- List of apostolados
