= Saint Luke (El Greco) =

Painting by El Greco

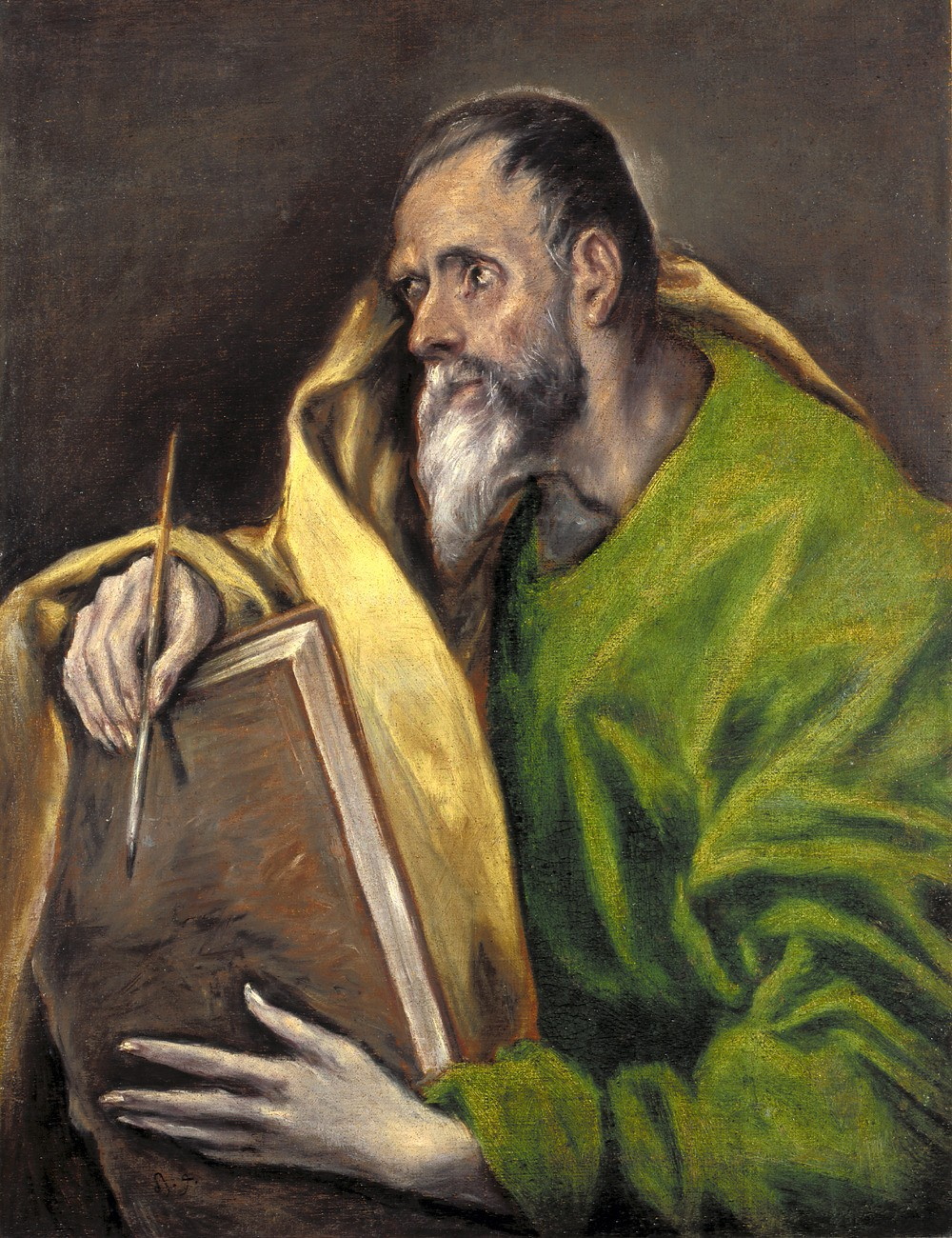
- Artist: El Greco
- Year: ca. 1610–1614
- Medium: Oil on canvas
- Dimensions: 81.4 cm × 55.0 cm (32 1/16 in × 21 5/8 in)
- Location: Indianapolis Museum of Art; Indianapolis

Saint Luke is an oil painting on canvas created ca. 1610–1614 by the Greek artist Doménikos Theotokópoulos, known as El Greco. It is now in the Indianapolis Museum of Art in Indianapolis, Indiana.

== Analysis ==
According to the gallery label provided by the Indianapolis Museum of Art:

"During the last decade of his career, El Greco played a major role in popularizing a type of pictorial ensemble known as the apostolado, or "apostle Series." A complete Apostolado normally comprises thirteen pictures, with twelve bust-length paintings of Apostles and one of Christ as Savior.

These three paintings [i.e. Saint Luke, Saint Matthew and Saint Simon – all three in the Indianapolis collection] belong to an incomplete set of nine Apostles from the parish church of Almadrones, a small town in the Spanish province of Guadalajara. The church was badly damaged during the Spanish Civil War (1936–39) and the paintings were removed for safekeeping and eventually sold.".

== Provenance ==
According to the gallery label provided by the Indianapolis Museum of Art:

"Parish church of Almadrones (Guadalajara), Spain, until 1936 or immediately after{1}; removed to the Fuerte of Guadalajara (former convent of San Francisco) until 1941{2}; at the Museo Nacional del Prado, Madrid, for conservation treatment, 1941–45; restituted to the bishopric of Sigüenza in 1945, sold and legally exported in 1952{3}; (Newhouse Galleries, Inc. New York); Dr. G.H.A. Clowes [1877–1958], Indianapolis, in1952{4}; The Clowes Fund Collection, Indianapolis, 1958–present (C10034)".

== See also ==
- List of works by El Greco
