= Hospital del Nuncio Nuevo =

Building in Toledo, Spain

Coordinates: 39.8601°N 4.0297°W

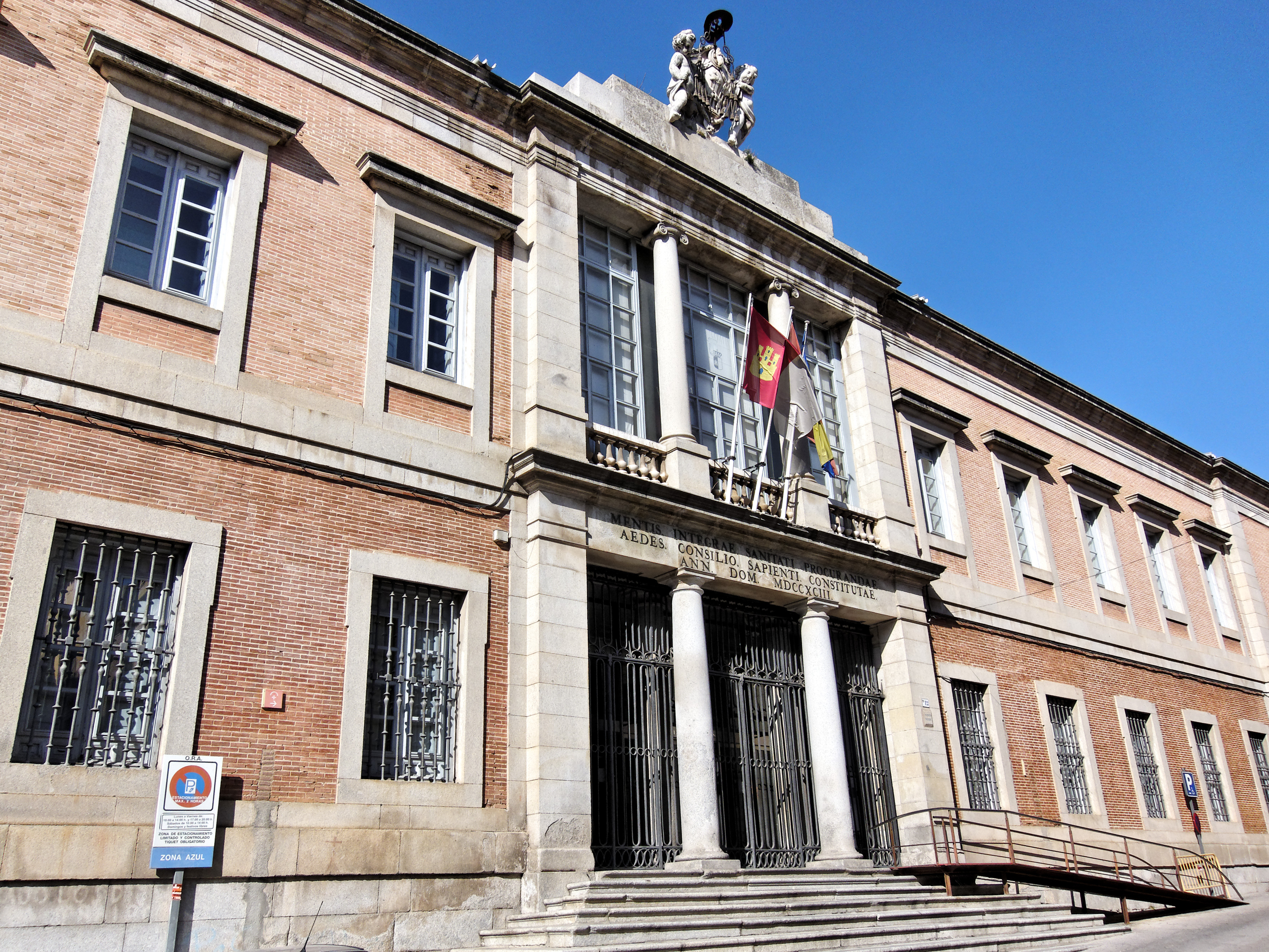
Hospital del Nuncio Nuevo

The Hospital del Nuncio Nuevo is a Neoclassical hospital located in city of Toledo, in Castile-La Mancha, Spain. It was commissioned by Cardinal Lorenzana at the end of the 18th century. Built to house people with mental illness, it represents an advanced hospital architecture for its time.

The entrance is made through a double portico in the center of the facade, with superimposed galleries of three spans each. It is a building of great dimensions and regular proportions, structured around four courtyards; The plant responds to a cross inscribed in a rectangle with the chapel in the central body, oval and vaulted.

The main façade of two heights on a stone base, allowed the designers to alleviate the unevenness of the street. In its interior the most remarkable thing is the development of the main staircase in several sections of great amplitude, that connects the entrance with the chapel.

Since 1985, various administrative services of the Regional Government have been housed in it, and currently houses the headquarters of the Ministry of Economy and Finance.
