= Almadrones =

Almadrones, Spain
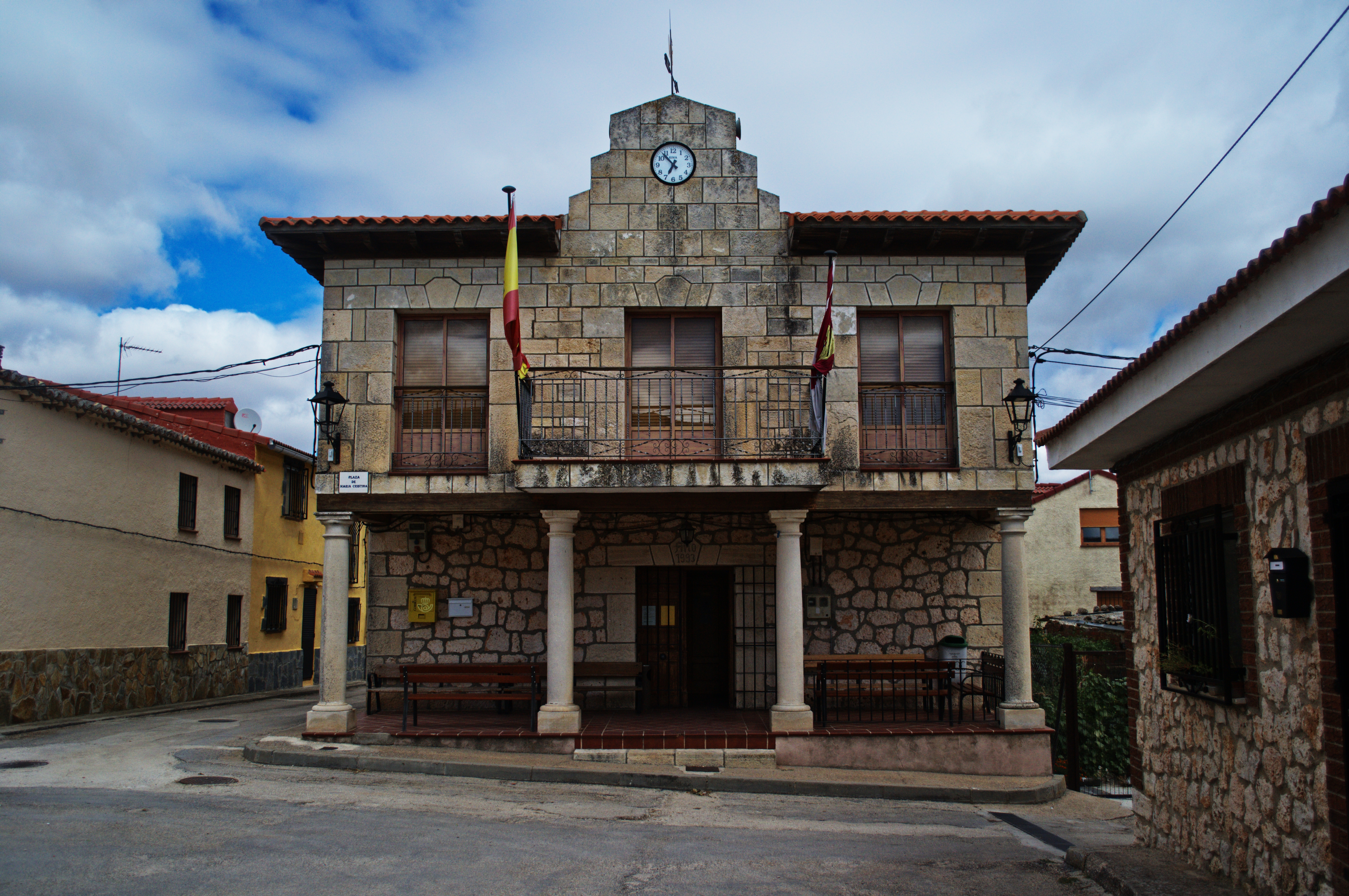

- Coat of arms

- Location within Province of Guadalajara Location within Castilla-La Mancha Location within Spain
- Coordinates: 40°54′8″N 2°46′20″W
- Country: Spain
- Autonomous community: Castile-La Mancha
- Province: Guadalajara
- Municipality: Almadrones

Area
  - Total: 21 km^{2} (8.1 sq mi)

Population (2025-01-01)
  - Total: 67
  - Density: 3.2/km^{2} (8.3/sq mi)
- Time zone: UTC+1 (CET)
  - Summer (DST): UTC+2 (CEST)

Almadrones is a municipality located in the province of Guadalajara, Castile-La Mancha, Spain. According to the 2004 census (INE), the municipality has a population of 109 inhabitants.
