= Baptism of Christ (disambiguation) =

The Baptism of Christ is an event described in the gospels of Matthew, Mark and Luke.

Baptism of Christ may also refer to:

- Baptism of the Lord, a liturgical feast
- The Baptism of Christ (Donatello), a sculpture by Donatello
- The Baptism of Christ (Piero della Francesca), a 1448–1450 painting by Piero della Francesca
- The Baptism of Christ (Verrocchio), a painting by Verrocchio
- Baptism of Christ (Perugino, Rome), a fresco of about 1482
- Baptism of Christ (Cima da Conegliano), a 1492 altarpiece
- Baptism of Christ (Bellini), an altarpiece of c. 1500
- Baptism of Christ (Perugino, Città della Pieve), an altarpiece of c. 1510
- Baptism of Christ (Titian), a painting by Titian of c. 1512
- The Baptism of Christ (David), a painting by Gerard David
- The Baptism of Christ (Mantegna), a painting by Andrea Mantegna
- The Baptism of Christ (Annibale Carracci), a 1585 painting by Annibale Carracci
- Baptism of Christ (El Greco, Toledo), a 1608–1614 painting by El Greco
- Baptism of Christ, a panel of the Doña María de Aragón Altarpiece of c. 1596 by El Greco
- Baptism of Christ (El Greco, Heraklion), a c. 1567–1569 painting by El Greco
