= Ramiro Davalos =

Argentine artist, mural painter and illustrator

Ramiro Dávalos
- Born: 25 July 1924; Salta, Salta Province, Argentina
- Died: 20 May 2000 (aged 75); Cerrillos, Salta Province, Argentina
- Education: National University of Tucumán (with Lino Enea Spilimbergo); student of Luis García Bes
- Known for: Painting, murals, book illustration
- Movement: Landscape, Figurative art; Portrait

Ramiro Dávalos (Español: Ramiro Dávalos; July 25, 1924, Salta, Argentina - May 20, 2000, Cerrillos, Salta, Argentina) was an Argentine artist, mural painter and illustrator.

== Early life ==
Ramiro Dávalos descended from a dynasty founded by Dr. José Benjamín Dávalos, who was a governor of Salta and developer of The Tacuil winery, the oldest winery in Argentina (founded by his father-in-law in 1831) that was incorporated French vines of Malbec and Cabernet Sauvignon and still exists in the Calchaquí Valley. He was the fifth child of Argentinian poet Juan Carlos Dávalos.

In his teens, Ramiro showed a musical talent sang and accompanied himself on the guitar. His vocation for the visual arts led him to decorate the walls of Dávalos family home, known as la veinte (“the twenty”).

He began his professional painting studies with Luis García Bes, a pioneer of Argentine textile art, and, between 1948 and 1951, continued at the National University of Tucumán with Lino Enea Spilimbergo.

== Career ==
In 1948, Dávalos received a second prize at the First Provincial Painting Salon of Salta, and in 1951 he obtained second prize in printmaking at the Salón del Norte in Tucumán.

In 1952, he made his first time illustrations for the book Antología poética authored by his father. Throughout his life, he illustrated a considerable number of books.

He painted several murals and had more than forty exhibitions across Argentina and in Buenos Aires, where he lived for several years. In 1961 he exhibited at the Groussac Gallery in the Federal Capital and in Santa Fe. The Pizarro and Van Riel galleries in Buenos Aires showcased his works from 1959 to 1964. He also exhibited at the Arthea, North, and ITF Theater galleries in Buenos Aires; the Don Quijote and Arcadia galleries in Córdoba; the Sciences Gallery in Rosario, Santa Fe; the Spilimbergo Gallery in Mendoza; and nearly all the galleries in Salta.

In 1964, a short film Hombre solo (Lonely Man) jointly produced by Grupo Prisma and the Association of Short Film Makers and directed by Fuad Quintar, was presented. It was dedicated to the practice of painting and consists of a visual journey through the works of Ramiro Dávalos. This documentary reveals a particular feature: the presence of the paintings is interwoven with moving images of the natural landscapes and inhabitants of northern Argentina, which served as a source of inspiration for the artist.

Upon his return to Salta, he joined the faculty of Provincial School of Fine Arts Tomás Cabrera in Salta, as the teaching staff.

In 1993, BBC selected Dávalos for an interview, recognizing him as the representative painter of Calchaquí Valley. In the same year, Mayor of Salta Víctor Abelardo Montoya paid tribute to the artist by naming him an Illustrious Citizen, an honor the painter acknowledged through an exhibition at the Fundación Banco del Noroeste, today - Fundación Salta.

The themes the artist most explored are the landscapes of the valleys of Salta and their inhabitants — American women and men. His works express the inevitability of human destiny, which tends to reduce beings to a minimal existence, yet without losing their profound meaning, so expressively conveyed in certain drawings on paper and canvases of religious themes including the series of Christ, The Baptisms of Christ, and Christ Among the Poor.

A historian Cayetano Córdoba Iturburu wrote in his book Eighty Years of Argentine Painting, describing a style of Dávalos: “The man of the color of baked clay and the landscape of the brown mountains... . [The painting of Ramiro Dávalos] is a painting of undeniable honesty, a personal painting animated by that noble spirit, rescuer of poetry, which consists of his deep love for our land”.

The artist's contemporaries also remembered that artist "was never interested in gathering papers, “credentials,” as if he knew that, however many he might accumulate, they could not improve his work. Nor was he concerned with entering competitions to win awards that might enhance his prestige…", "he lived supported by the provincial government through a monthly pension".

In his final years, Dávalos lived in Calchaquí Valley, Salta’s capital, Cerrillos, and San Lorenzo. He died on May 20, 2000, at the age of 75 in Cerrillos.

== Legacy ==
The paintings and drawings of Ramiro Dávalos are part of the collections of the Museum of Visual Arts in Tucumán; the Rosa Galisteo Museum in Santa Fe; Buenos Aires Museum of Modern Art; museums in Jujuy and Tucumán; and the Biblioteca Nacional. His works are also in the important private collections and exhibited in museums of England, the United States, Russia, Germany, Italy, Spain, and Chile.

As part of the Abril Cultural del año 2007 (Cultural April of 2007), his works were exhibited again at the Aristene Papi Cultural Center in Salta, accompanied by short film Hombre solo.

In 2010, the retrospective exhibition The Art of Ramiro Dávalos was held at the Museum of Fine Arts of Salta. During this event, the book-catalog of his works edited by Magdalena García Pinto and Leonor Navamuel was presented.

One of the squares in his hometown of Salta is named in honour of the artist.

== Personal life ==
Ramiro Dávalos was born in a huge family of Argentinian poet Juan Carlos Dávalos. His sister María Eugenia was a soprano singer and a lyricist. Brothers: Arturo was a poet and musician, who died at 40 and left several verses, poems, and songs; Baica Dávalos, a draftsman and writer who ended up more widely known in Venezuela than in Salta; Jaime, an acclaimed poet and composer, a multifaceted artist;, Martín Miguel, who left behind his own sambas; and Hernán who remained content as a simple carpenter.

Ramiro Dávalos was married to Doña Marta Cajal Zerdán, a teacher who supported his artistic path and inspired many of the women he portrayed. Together, they had eight children: Margarita, Baltasar, Ramiro, Beatriz, José, Lucía, Javier, and Virginia.

Sabrina Dávalos (born in Salta in the autumn of 1984), a granddaughter of the painter, is a violinist, folk singer and songwriter, art teacher and Senior Professor of Music.
