= Baptism of Christ (Titian) =

Painting by Titian

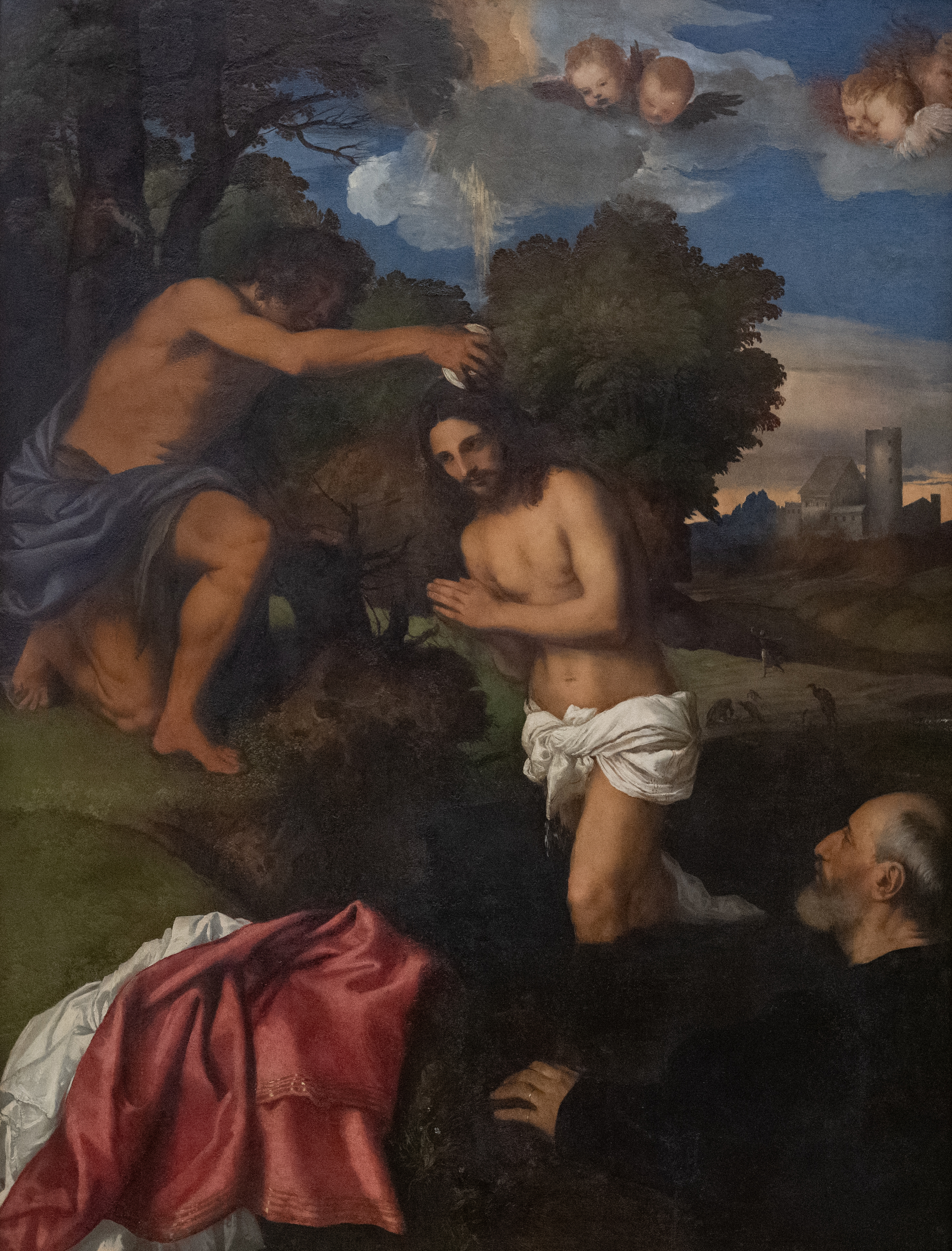
- Artist: Titian
- Year: c. 1512
- Medium: Oil on panel
- Dimensions: 115 cm × 89 cm (45 in × 35 in)
- Location: Capitoline Museums, Rome
- Accession: PC 41

The Baptism of Christ (Italian: Battesimo di Cristo) is an oil on panel religious painting by Titian, dated to c. 1512. It is held in the collection of the Capitoline Museums, in Rome.

== Description ==
In the Baptism of Christ, John the Baptist (top left) rests on Jesus (centre), and the donor, the Venetian Giovanni Ram (bottom right), whom the artist was obliged to introduce into the picture, is connected by a glance with the patron Saint. According to Ricketts, in 1910 the picture was "darkened in part", but the condition was "otherwise good".

== Date ==
Titian painted the Baptism of Christ at the end of his Giorgionesque period, about 1510 to 1512. Though the picture is described by Marc Antonio Michiel (the Anonimo Morelliano), who saw it, in 1531, in the house of Giovanni Ram (Messer Zuan Ram), the donor of it, it is not accepted by Crowe and Cavalcaselle, but ascribed to Paris Bordone. Morelli restored it to Titian.

== Analysis ==
I think that owing to a certain slightness in the conception of this work, the majority of writers on Titian have been tempted to under-estimate an intense idyllic charm, which in a painting by Giorgione would have been praised as a virtue. As a work of art it is characterised by that singular mansuetude of conception and neo-pagan blitheness of which Titian had the secret. The entranced gesture of Giovanni Ram aids in this impression. Surely nothing could heighten the tender gravity of this face, watching what might seem otherwise but some Theocritean idyll.

— Ricketts, Titian, p. 42.

Gronau and Ricketts both compare the figure of John in the Baptism of Christ (Gallery of the Capitol, Rome),—who kneels, supporting himself by his hand, and in this attitude, the upper part of his body bending forwards, completes the act of baptism,—with the figure of the shepherd in the Holy Family with a Shepherd (National Gallery, London), "a more noble figure than the shepherd," says Gronau, "but bearing to him, we might say, the strongest family likeness." The same figure recurs in the Three Ages of Man (Scottish National Gallery, Edinburgh).

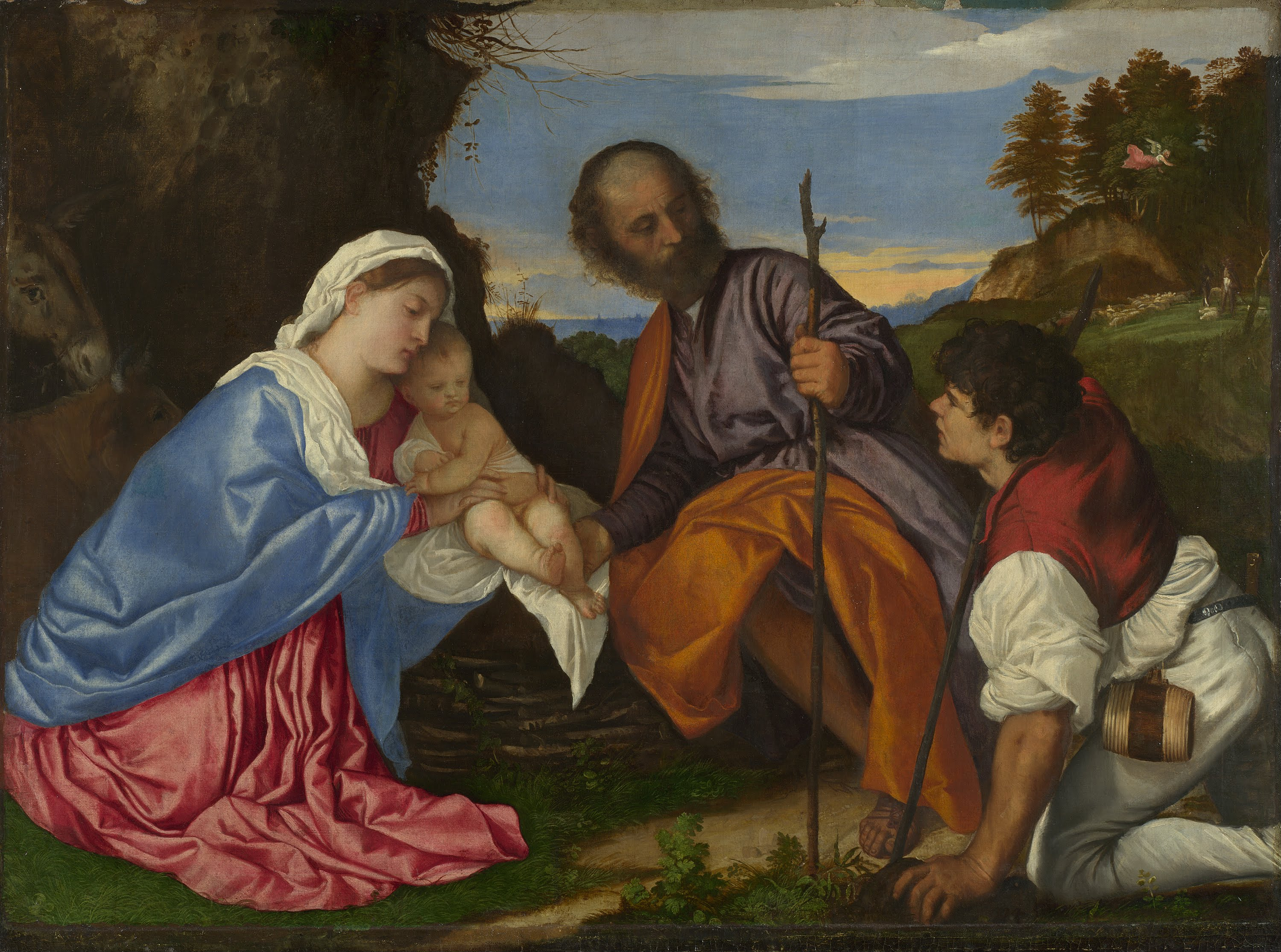
Holy Family with a Shepherd, c. 1510

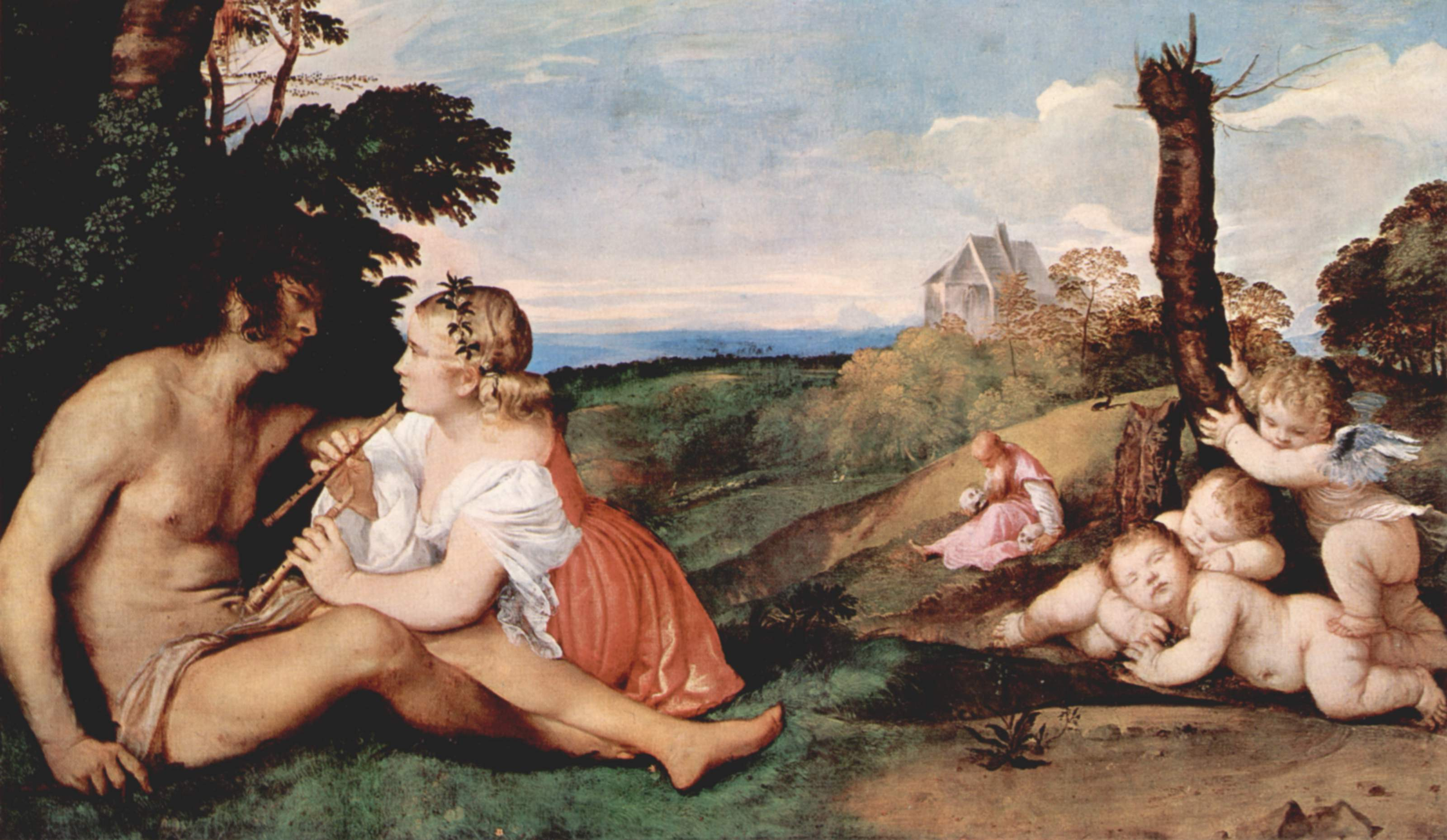
Three Ages of Man, c. 1512–1514

== See also ==
- List of works by Titian

== Sources ==
- Gronau, Georg (1904). Titian. London: Duckworth and Co; New York: Charles Scribner's Sons. pp. 10, 31–33, 295.
- Ricketts, Charles (1910). Titian. London: Methuen & Co. Ltd. pp. 42–43, 181, plate xxii.
- "Battesimo di Cristo". Musei Capitolini. Retrieved 7 March 2023.
