= Museum of El Greco =

Biographical museum in Greece

Coordinates: 35.3855°N 24.9508°E

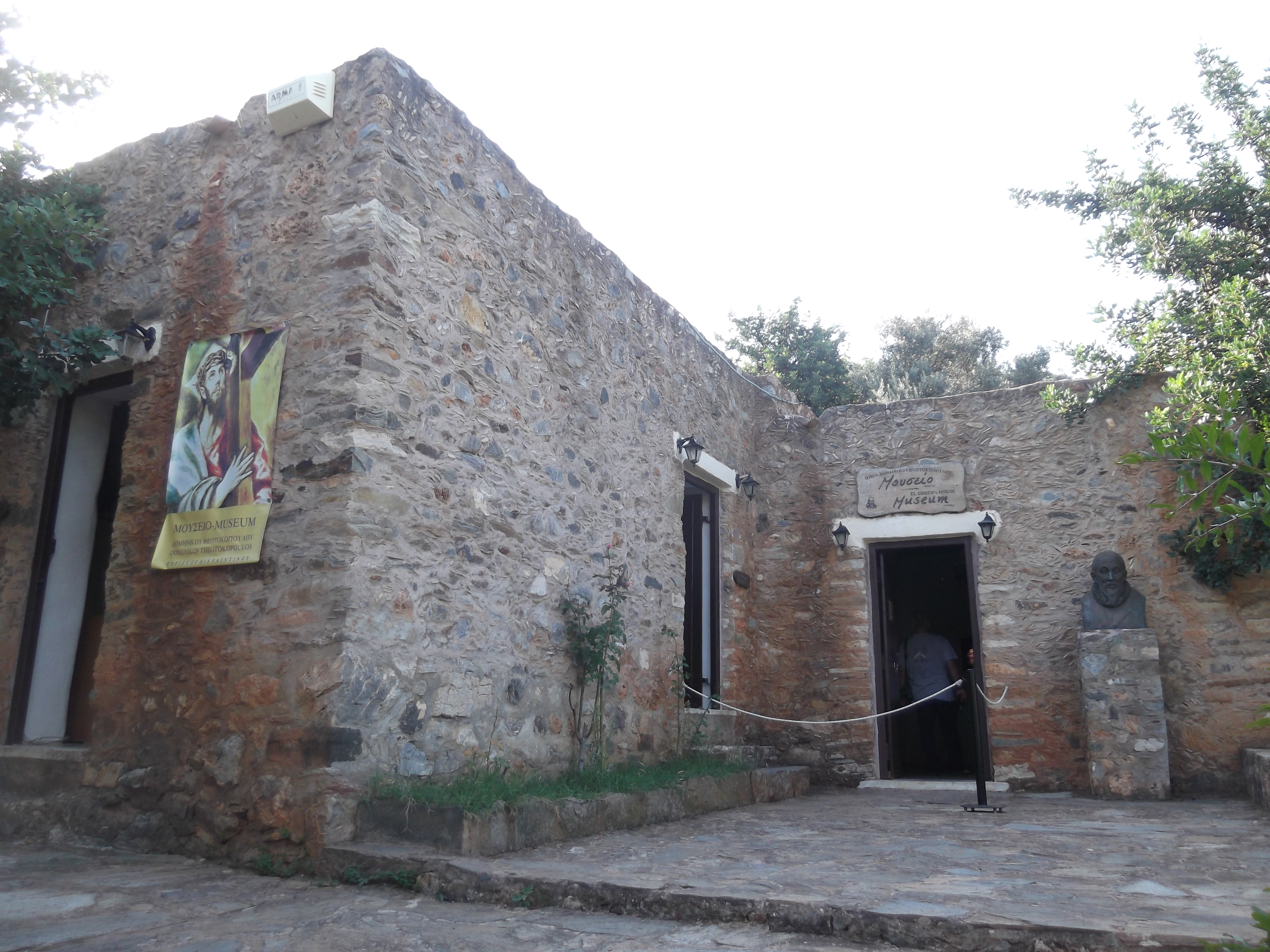
View of the museum entrance.

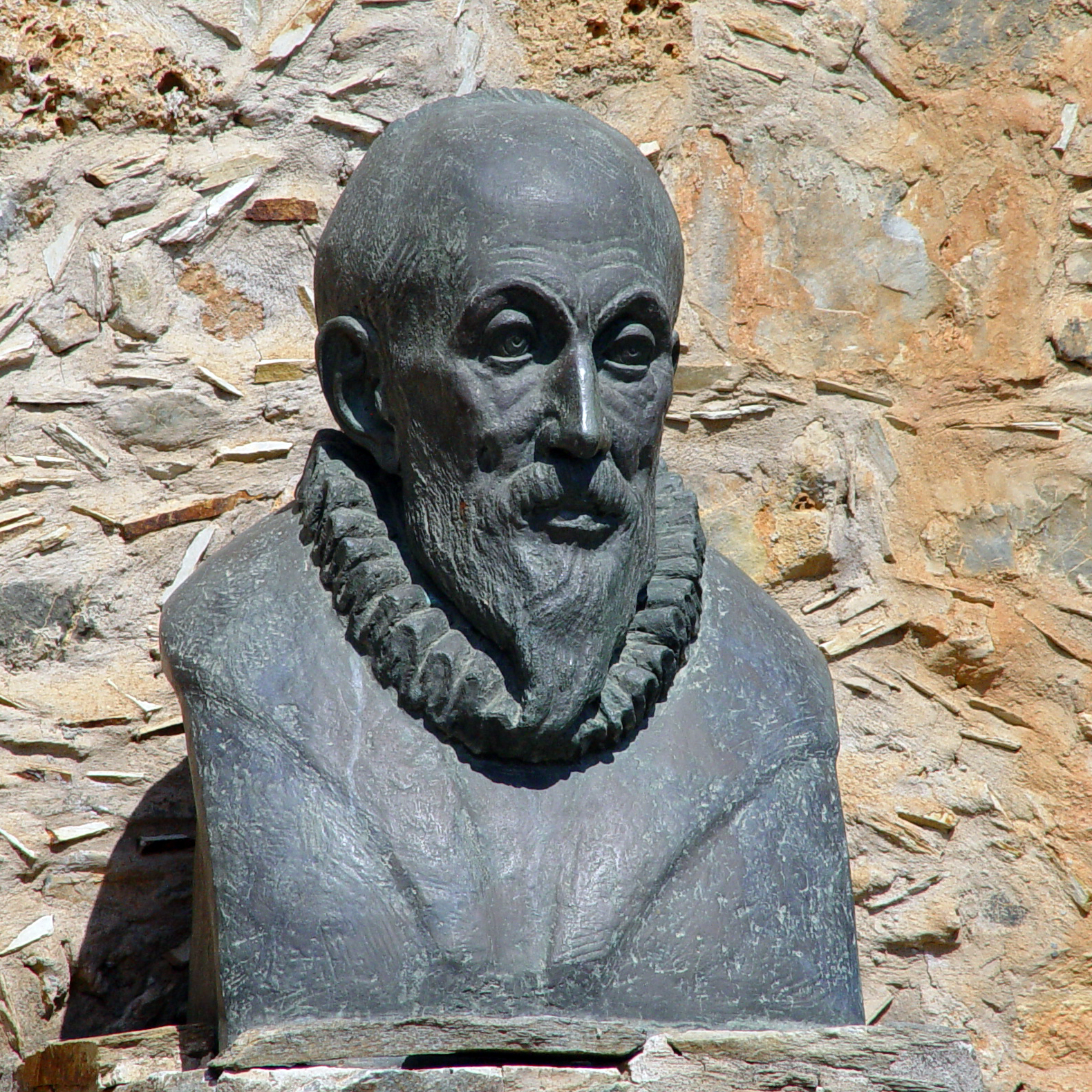
Bust of El Greco outside the museum.

The Museum of El Greco (a.k.a. El Greco Museum or Domenikos Theotokopoulos Museum) celebrates the mannerist painter El Greco (Domenikos Theotokopoulos, 1541–1614), who is said to have grown up in the village.

== History ==
Museum of El Greco opened to the public in 1998.It is located on the edge of the village of Fodele in Crete, Greece, west of the city of Heraklion. It is around 1 km from the centre of town opposite a chapel and houses copies of works by and documents associated with El Greco. The original building was in a ruinous state but was restored from 1982 onwards through a grant by the Greek Ministry of Culture. The village of Fodele is claimed as the birthplace of El Greco, but this is disputed.

The Historical Museum of Crete in Heraklion not far away includes two original works by El Greco, the only original works by the artist in Crete.

== Gallery ==
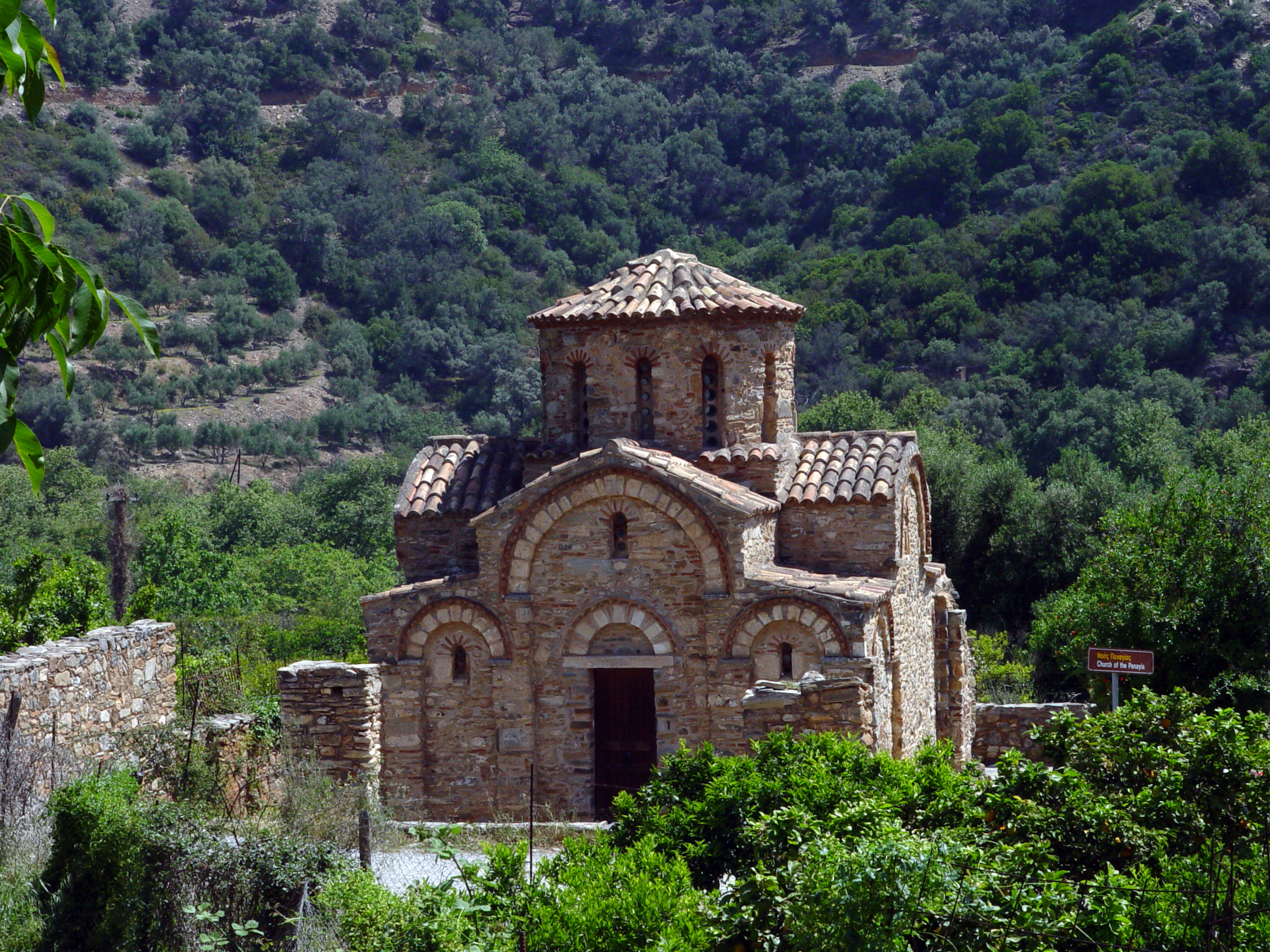
Chapel opposite the museum.

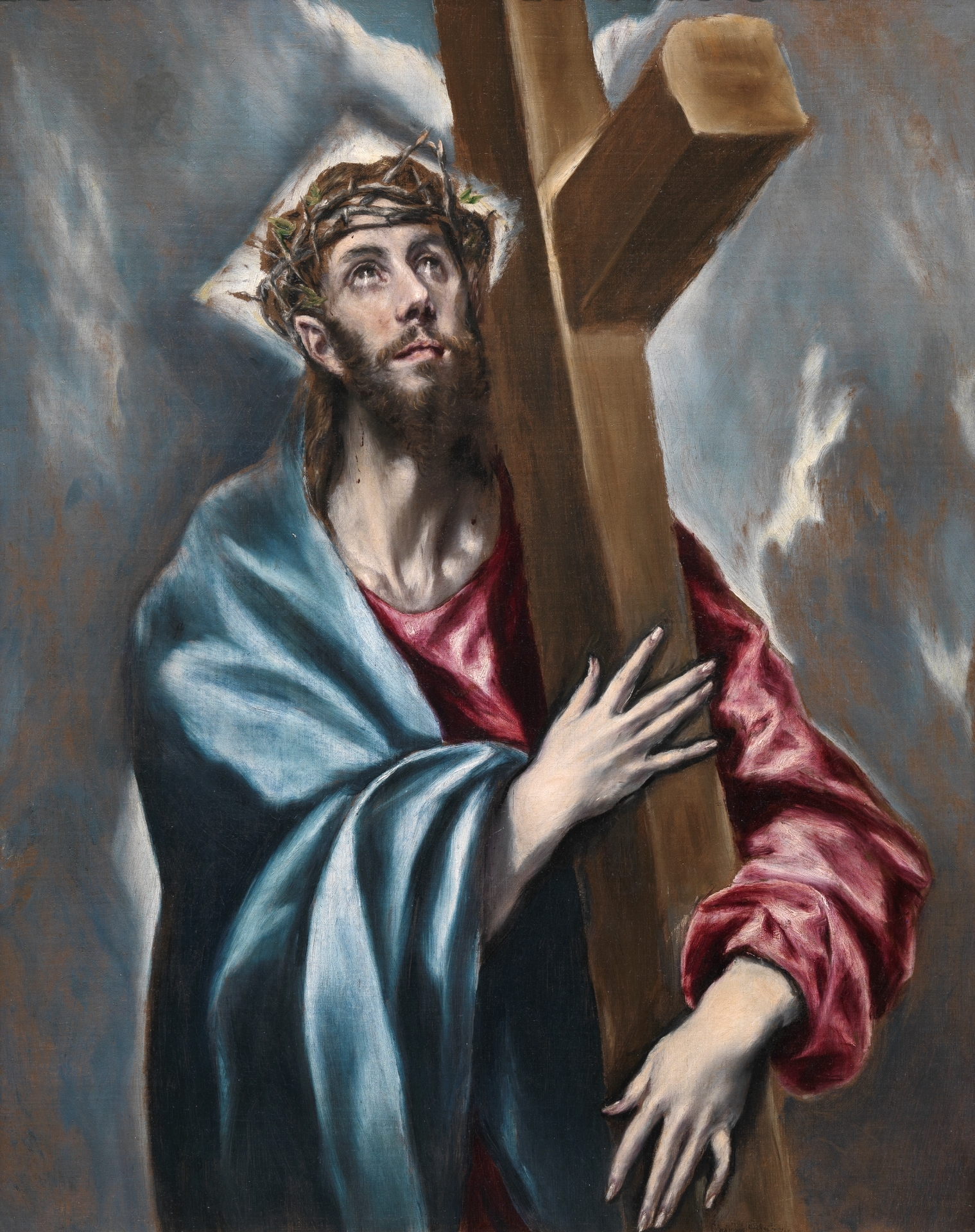
Christ Carrying the Cross, 1602 painting by El Greco in the Prado, Madrid, copy in the El Greco Museum.

== See also ==
- El Greco Museum, Toledo, Spain (where El Greco worked later)
- List of single-artist museums
