= Historical Museum of Crete =

Museum in Heraklion, Crete, Greece

Coordinates: 35°20′30.5″N 25°7′52.2″E

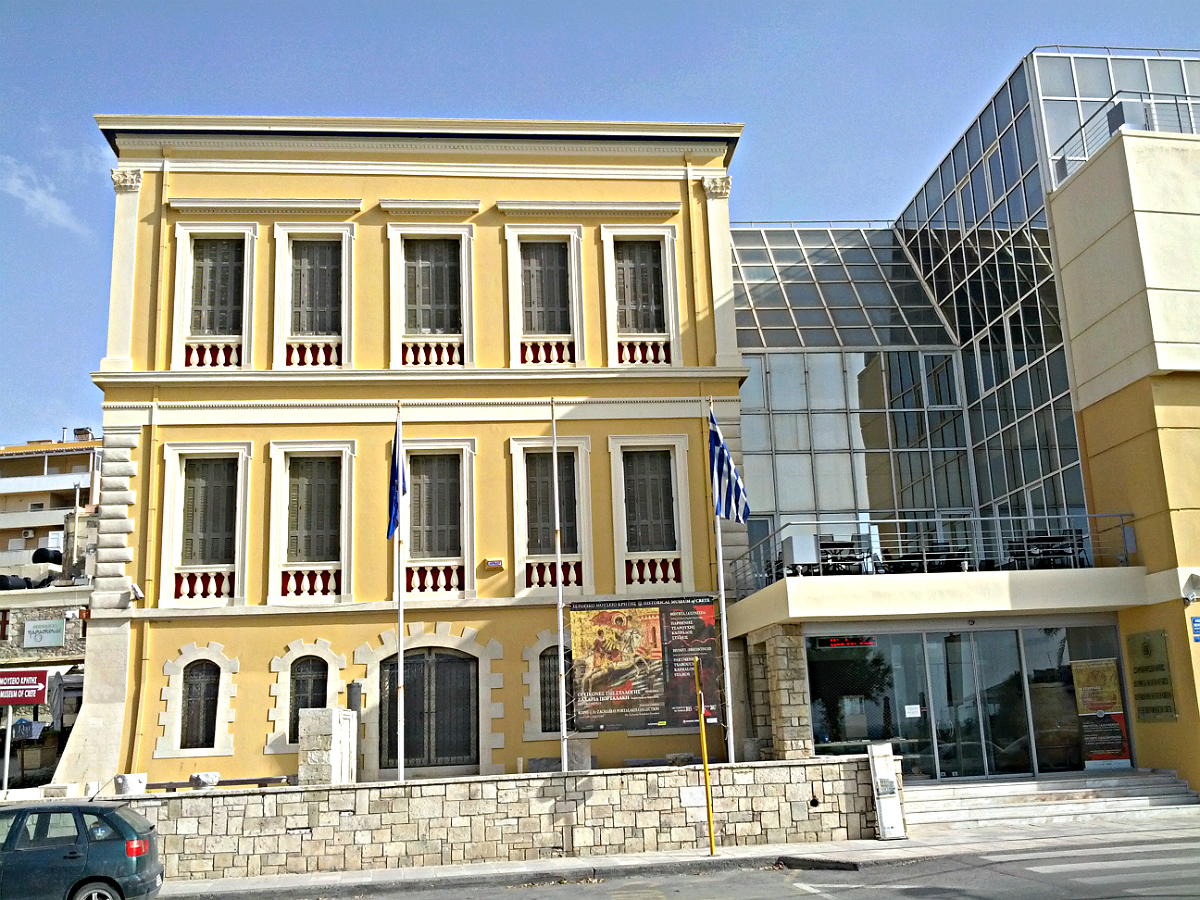
Front facade

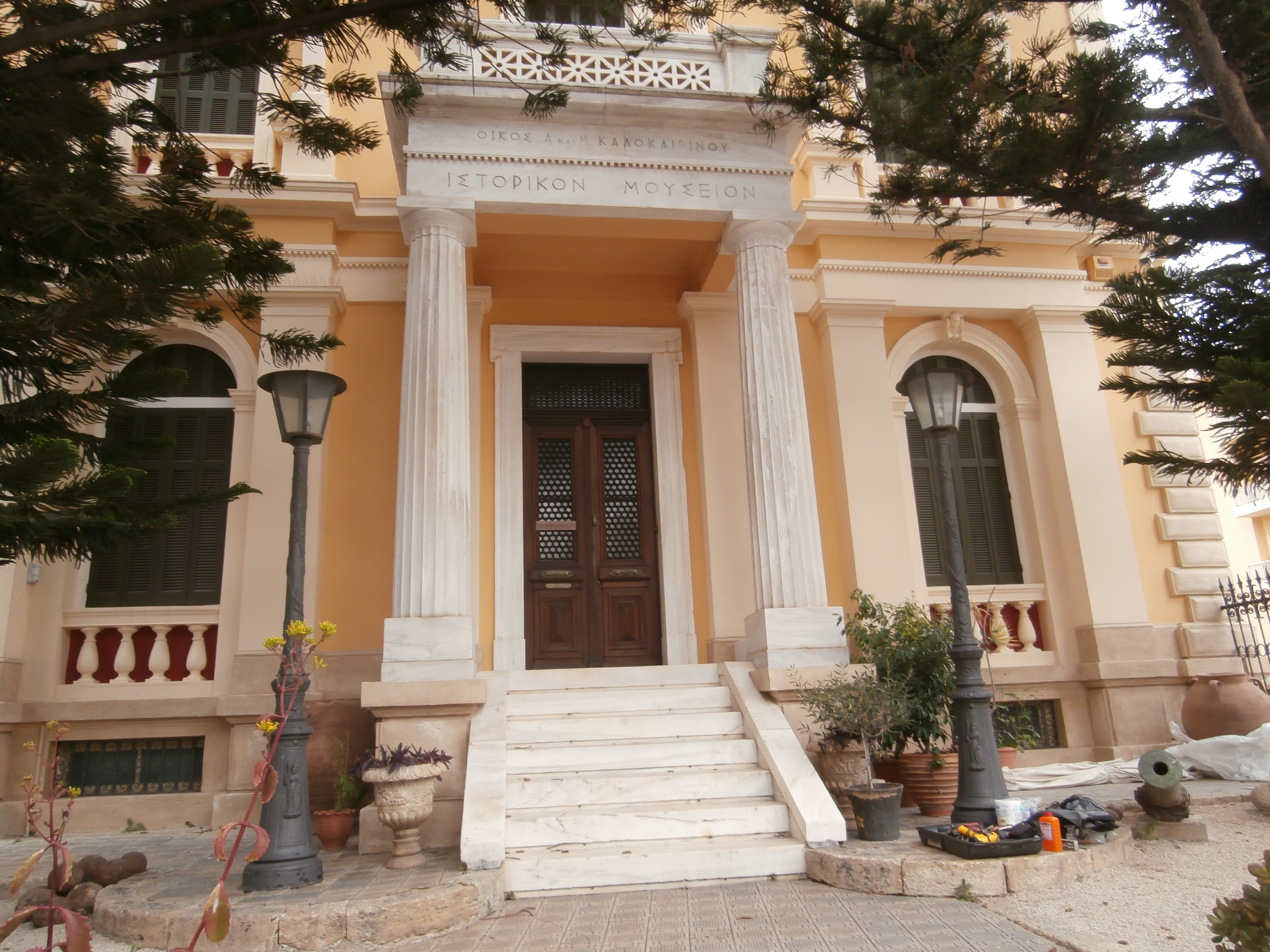
Back entrance

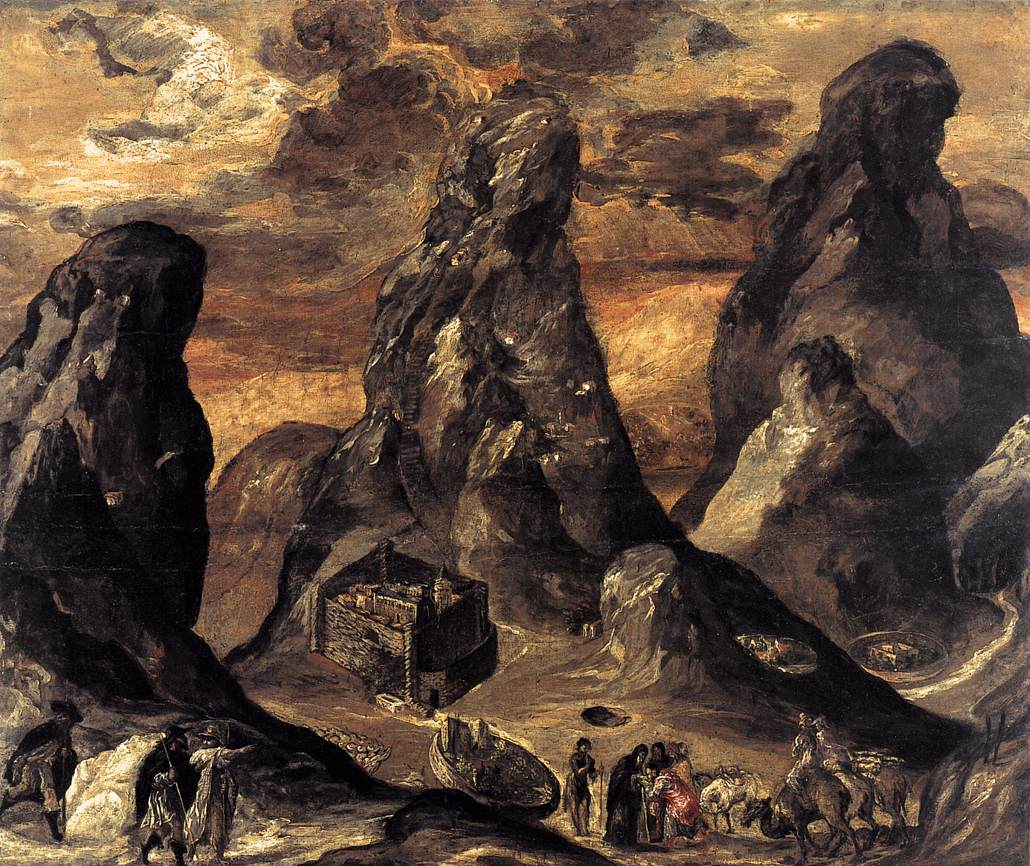
El Greco's View of Mount Sinai, located in the museum

The Historical Museum of Crete is a museum in Heraklion, Crete. It was founded by the Society of Cretan Historical Studies in 1953 and was originally housed in the former home of Minos Kalokairinos. The museum has since been expanded with a modern wing.

The museum's permanent collections highlight the art and history of Crete from the 4th century AD through the Second World War. The collections are ordered chronologically and by subject matter, and are combined with visual material and multimedia. They include ceramics, sculptures, coins, jewelry, wall paintings, portable icons, ritual objects, manuscripts, heirlooms, weavings, and the reconstructed interior of a Cretan rural home. The museum exhibits two paintings by El Greco, who was born in Crete as Domenikos Theotokopoulos: View of Mount Sinai (1570–1572) and Baptism of Christ (c. 1567–1569). These are his only works in Crete. There is also a 4×4 meter mock-up of mid-17th century Chandax (Heraklion), at the time when the city reached its peak under Venetian rule. The Nikos Kazantzakis Collection features the study and library from the author's home in Antibes, France, personal effects, manuscripts of his works, first editions of books in various languages, etc.

The temporary exhibition rooms at the Historical Museum of Crete host exhibitions on a wide range of themes (e.g., in summer 2012, the life and work of poet Odysseas Elytis).

The museum library, featuring rare editions and much archive and photographic material, serves both researchers and the general public.

== See also ==
- Museum of El Greco
