= Città della Pieve Cathedral =

Cathedral in Città della Pieve, Italy

Coordinates: 42.95248°N 12.004178°E

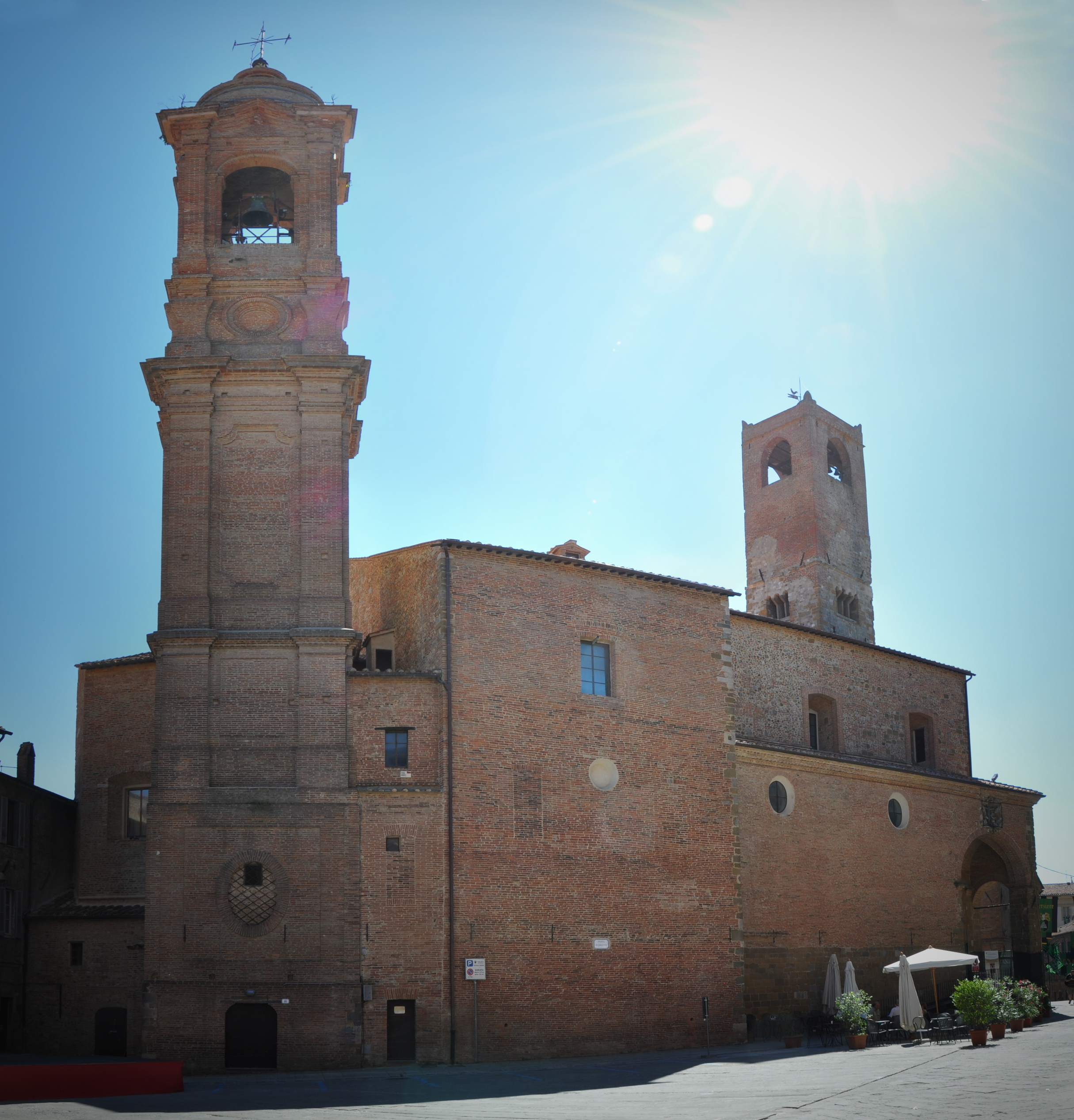
The cathedral

Città della Pieve Cathedral (Italian: Concattedrale dei Santi Gervasio e Protasio; Duomo di Città della Pieve) is the principal place of worship of Città della Pieve, Umbria, Italy. It is dedicated to Saints Gervasius and Protasius. Formerly the episcopal seat of the Diocese of Città della Pieve, since 1986 it has been the co-cathedral of the Roman Catholic Archdiocese of Perugia-Città della Pieve.

The first church on the site dated from between the 4th and 5th centuries. This was replaced by a Romanesque structure, which was itself rebuilt in the Gothic style in the 13th century. In the Gothic period a crypt was also built below the high altar on the remains of Etruscan and ancient Roman secular buildings. Few traces of these phases remain in the present church, built in the 16th and 17th centuries. The side chapels and bell tower belong to this period.

== Artworks ==
- Perugino, Baptism of Christ (c.1510) and Madonna in Glory with Saints (1514)
- Antonio Circignani (Il Pomarancio), Betrothal of the Virgin (1620) and Madonna del Carmine (1528)
- Domenico Alfani, Enthroned Madonna and Child with Saints Martin and Mary Magdalene (1521)
- Giannicola di Paolo (attributed to), Madonna and Saints
- Salvio Savini, Enthroned Madonna with Saints
- Giambologna (attributed), wooden crucifix (1550)
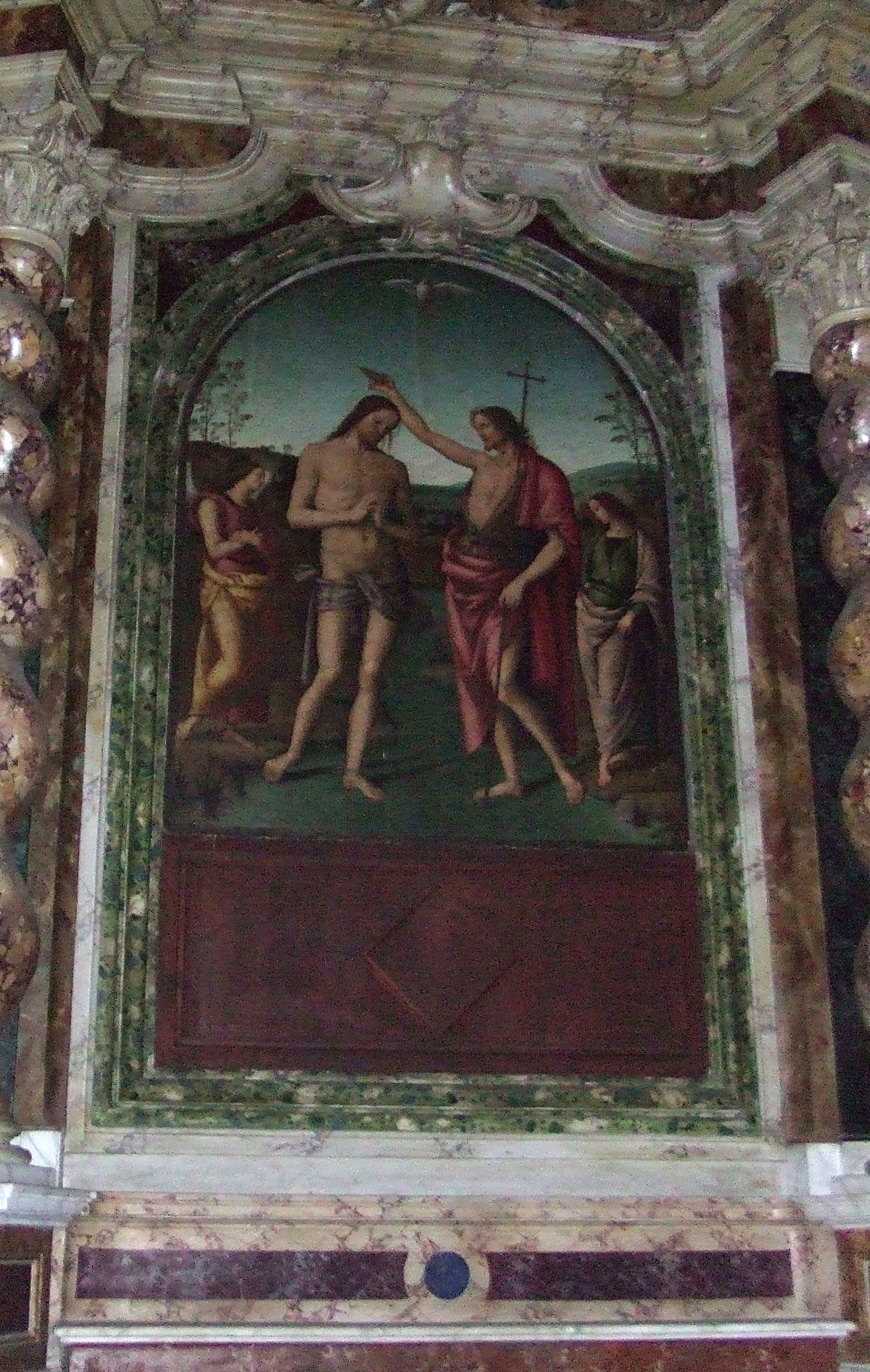
Baptism of Christ, Perugino

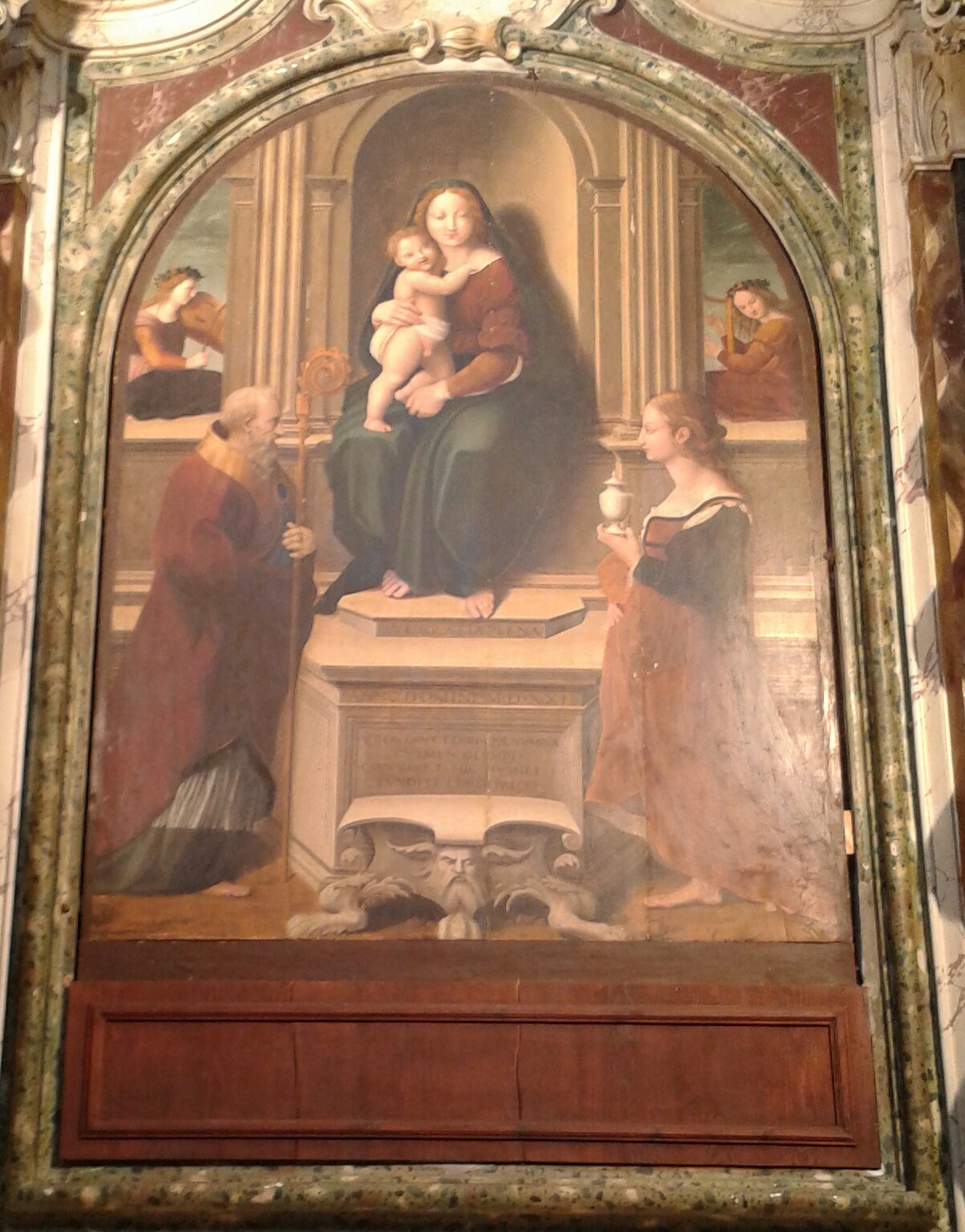
Enthroned Madonna and Child with Saints Martin and Mary Magdalene, Alfani

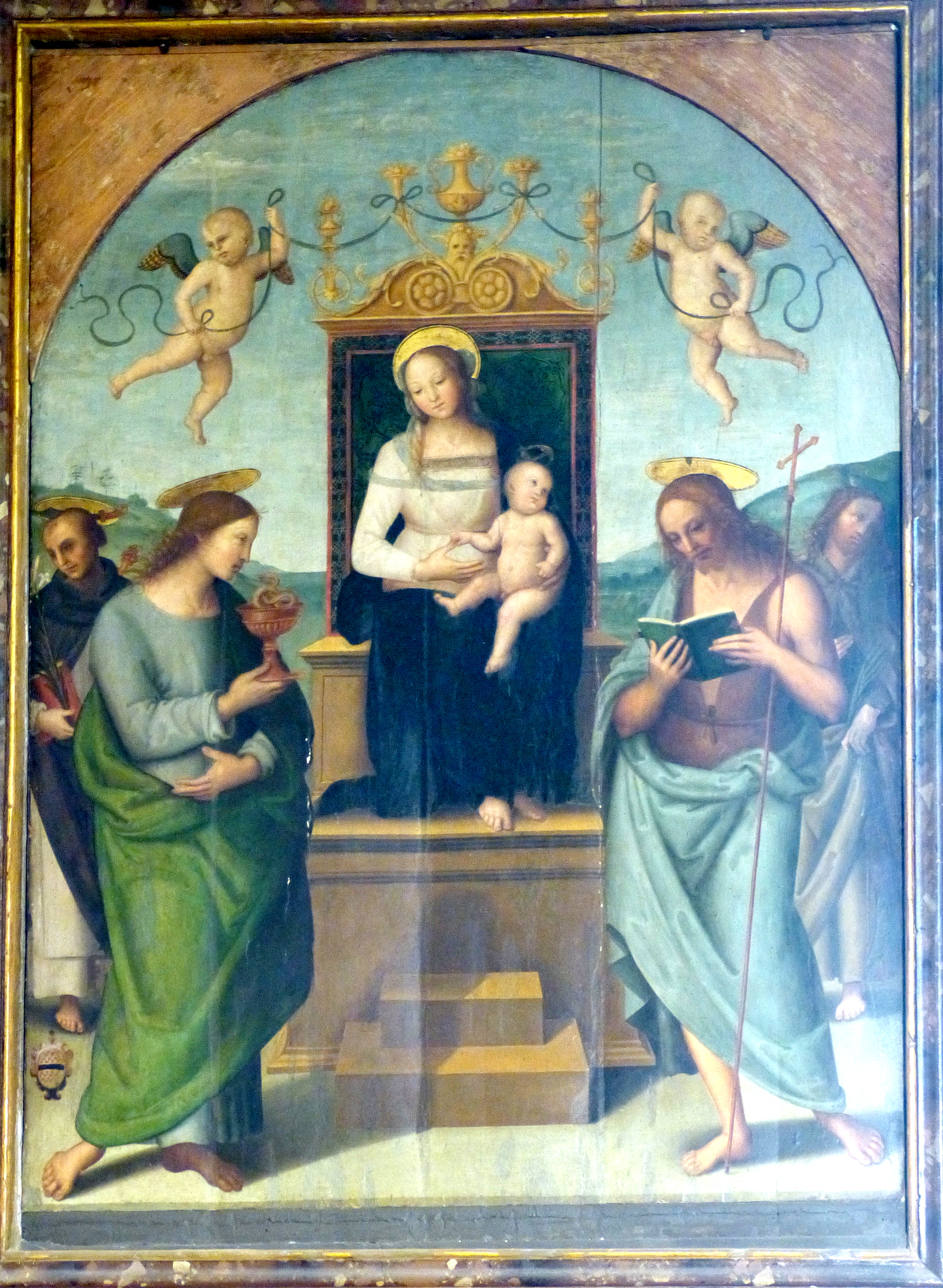
Gloria, possibly by Perugino, possibly restored by Circignani

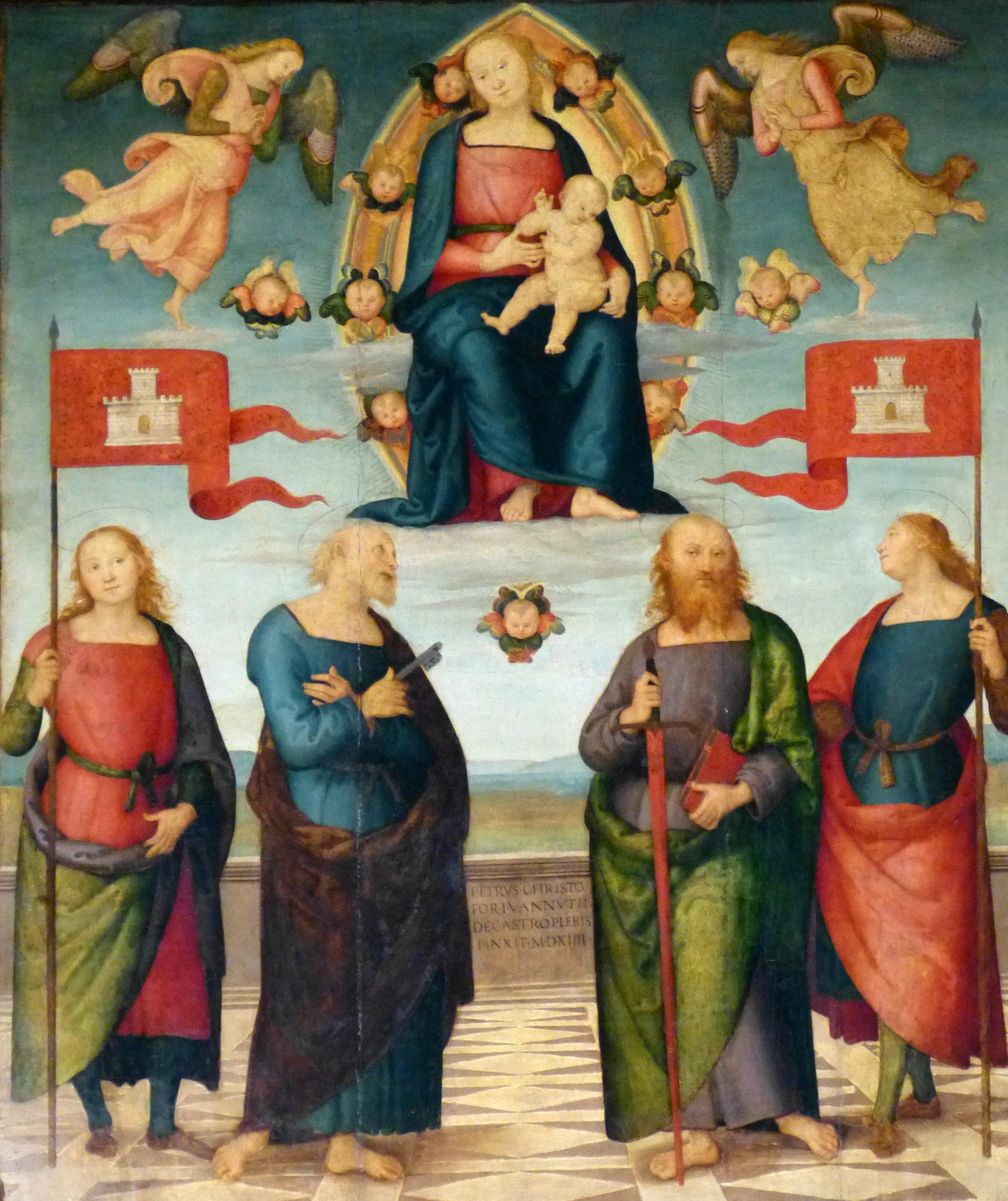
High altar, Perugino
