= The Three Ages of Man (Titian) =

1512-14 painting by Titian

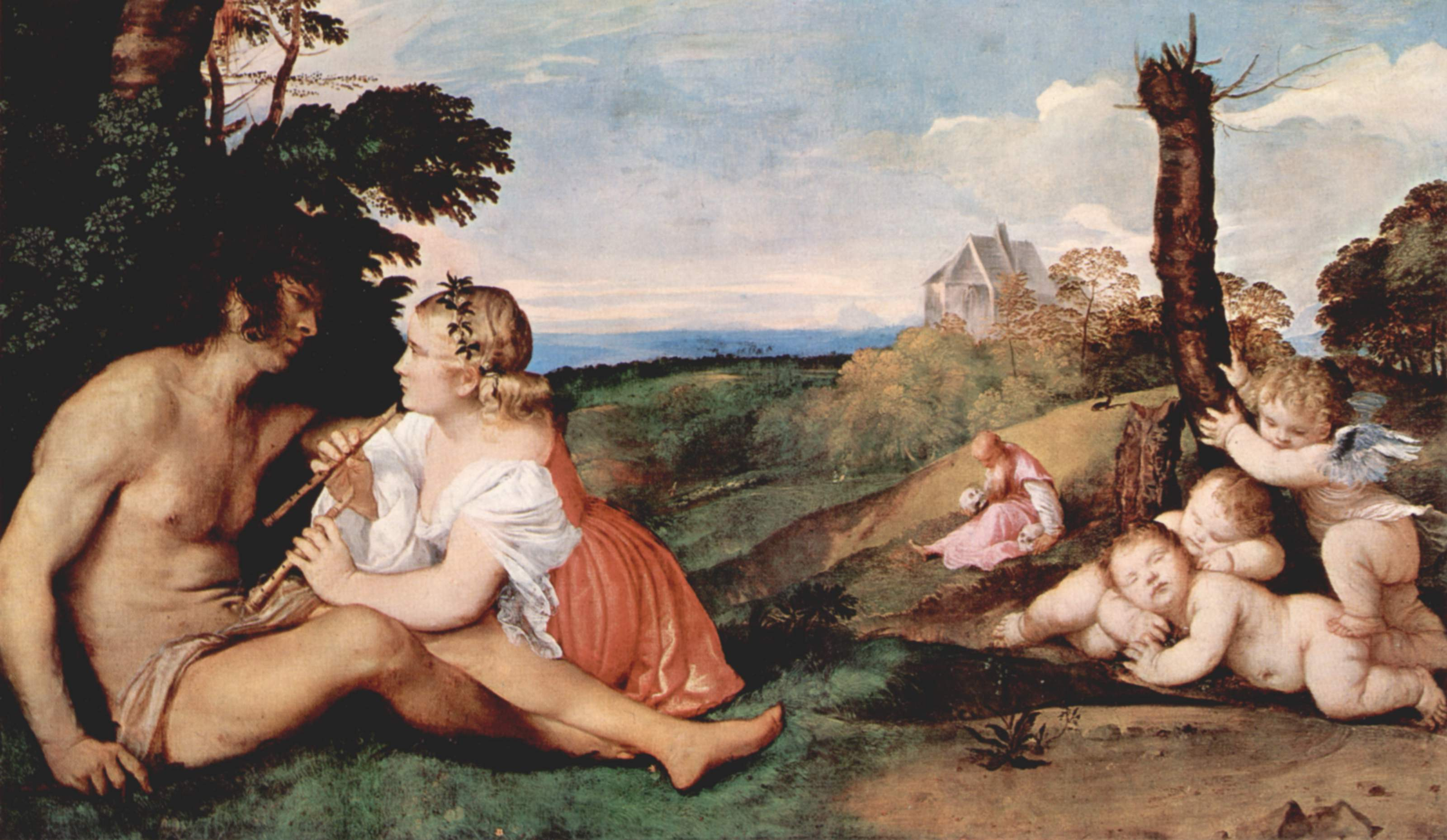
- Artist: Titian
- Year: c. 1512–14
- Medium: Oil on canvas
- Dimensions: 90 cm × 150.7 cm (35 in × 59.3 in)
- Location: National Gallery of Scotland; Edinburgh

The Three Ages of Man (Italian Le tre età dell'uomo) is a painting by Titian, dated between 1512 and 1514, and now displayed at the Scottish National Gallery in Edinburgh. The 90 cm high by 151 cm wide Renaissance art work was most likely influenced by Giorgione's themes and motifs of landscapes and nude figures—Titian was known to have completed some of Giorgione's unfinished works after Giorgione died at age 33 of the plague in 1510. The painting represents the artist's conception of the life cycle. Childhood and manhood are synonymous with earthly love and death. These and the approaching old age are drawn realistically. Titian's widely chosen topic in art history, ages of man, mixed with his own allegorical interpretation make The Three Ages of Man one of Titian's most famous works.

== History ==
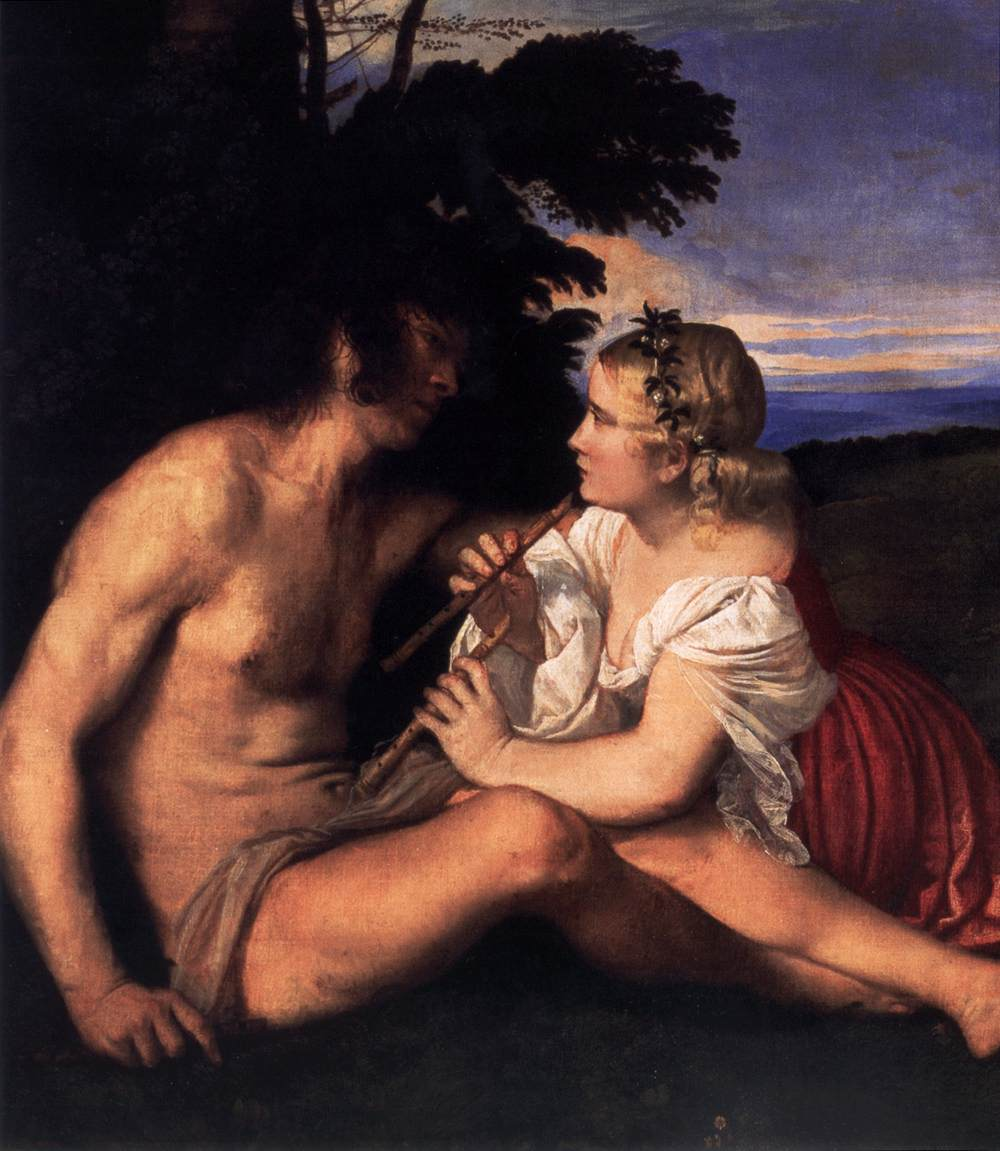
Detail

Giorgio Vasari, one of the most important biographers of the Renaissance, states Titian painted The Three Ages of Man after returning to Venice for the father-in-law of famous gem-engraver and medallist Giovanni Bernardi, also known as Giovanni di Castel Bolognese at Faenza, dated to 1515. Critics have also dated it slightly earlier, due to the three sleeping putti to the right, evidently modelled on the Santa Giustina altarpiece by Romanino (Musei Civici di Padova), which dates to 1513. Several copies of The Three Ages are known, one of the most notable of which is that at Rome's Doria Pamphilj Gallery, attributed to Sassoferrato. Many art historians have debated the possibility that two or three of these copies came from Titian's workshop.

From Giovanni Bernardi, the painting then came into possession of Cardinal Otto Truchsess von Waldburg, a leading figure at the Habsburg court and a prominent art patron. There is no record of direct exchange between Bernardi and Cardinal Truchsess but it is a known fact that, at some point, the painting was in the care of both of their hands. Both men knew Titian himself, and Cardinal Truchsess would have frequented Italy around the time of Bernardi's death in 1553 due to the deaths of five popes from 1549-1565.

The masterpiece later fell into the hands of Matthäus Hopfer, known to have a house in the Grottenau filled with 'poetic fable' frescoes. After his death in 1623, the painting was then passed down to the Ebert family, before being put into the Augsburg market. The first concrete record of the painting dates to 1662, listed in the collection of Queen Christina of Sweden at Palazzo Riario in Rome. Joachim von Sandrart notes that The Three Ages of Man was purchased by the Queen from one "Herr von Waldburg" (of no relation to Cardinal Truchsess) in Augsburg for 1,000 Reichsthaler, likely as she passed through the city from the Netherlands to Rome in October 1655.

The Three Ages of Man was later purchased in 1692 by Prince Livio Odescalchi and again in 1720 by Philippe II, Duke of Orléans. It remained in the Orleans Collection until 1798, where it was purchased by Francis Egerton, 3rd Duke of Bridgewater, whose descendants later deposited his whole collection with the National Gallery of Scotland for storage and display.

== Commentary ==
The Scottish National Gallery describes the painting as a poetic meditation on the transience of human life and love set in a pastoral landscape, in consonance with popular Italian poetic movements of the time period. The Three Ages of Man is divided into three distinct life-stages representative each of the implications of psychological maturity that are likely to occur at each stage. At the right Cupid playfully clambers over two sleeping putti; this portion of the piece represents infancy. At the left we see young lovers about to embrace. Titian breaks chronology between life phases by placing these lovers in the far left and at the foremost distance from the viewer. This serves to emphasize the most perfect phase of life, as the lovers sit enamored on flat ground covered with the healthiest, most vibrant grass within the landscape, not having yet begun their unavoidable descent to the bottom of the hill where the old man sits.

X-Rays of the painting indicate a large number of pentimenti within the composition, even for Titian's standards. Titian had originally painted the woman's head slightly facing the spectator, but ultimately decided to paint her in a pure profile pose to display a more consuming engagement with her lover. Her lover sits with his back arched similarly to the old man in the center of the composition, who is representative of old age, loss, and "the vanity of earthly existence" according to art historian Judith Dundas. The old man, looking very much like the penitent Jerome, is contemplating a pair of skulls, which by implication, are of former lovers. Titian had originally painted more skulls surrounding the old man. Scholars note that in other lost versions of the composition the extra skulls may have been left present, seeing as the Sassoferrato copy of the composition includes them, but they were painted over by Titian in the Sutherland copy, presumably to emphasize the dualism of the lovers or to reduce any unnecessarily macabre tones. The church in the background may serve to remind viewers of the Christian promise of salvation and eternal life.
