= Holy Family with a Shepherd =

c. 1510 painting by Titian

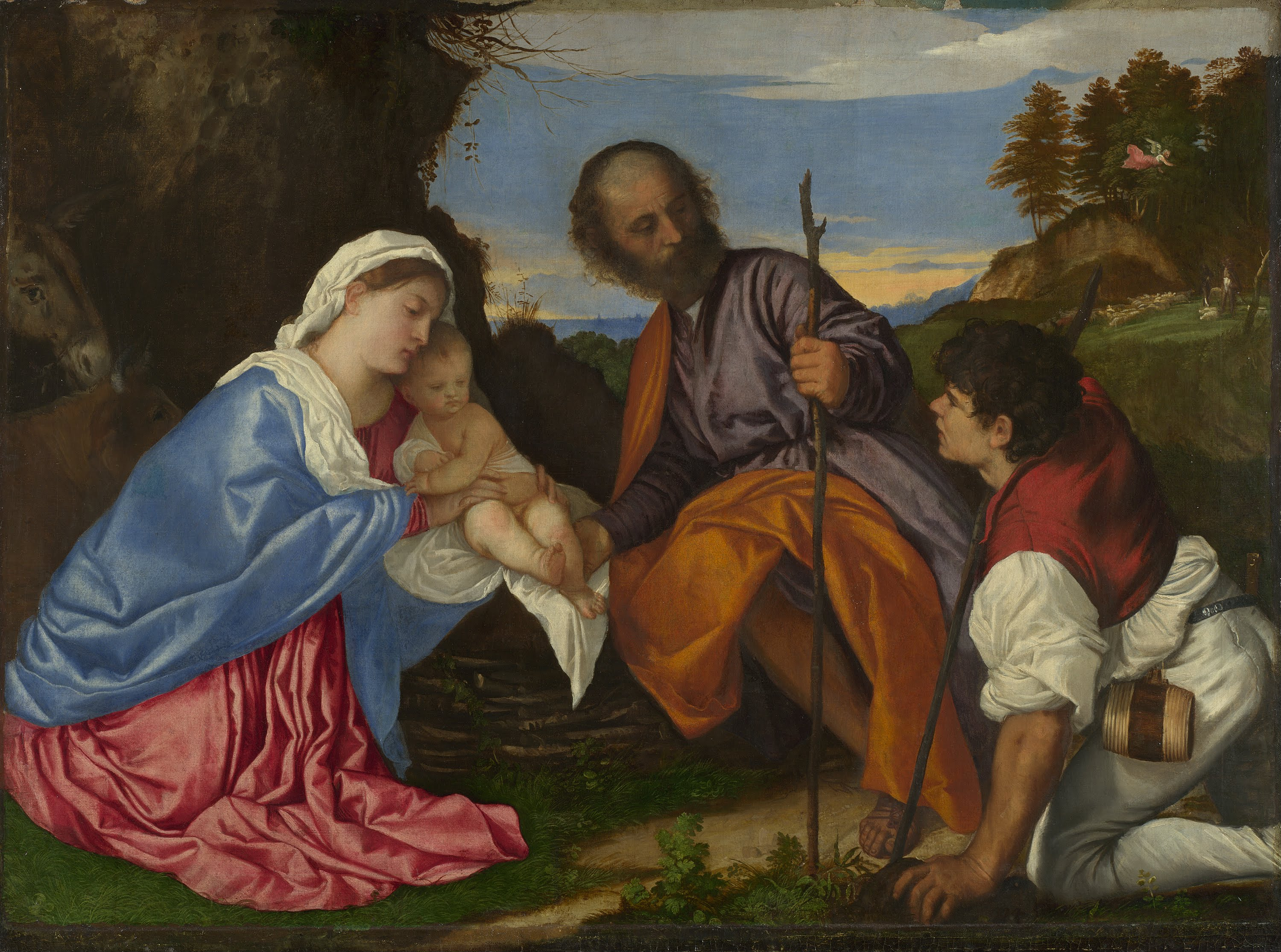
- Artist: Titian
- Year: c. 1510
- Medium: oil on canvas
- Dimensions: 99 cm × 137 cm (39 in × 54 in)
- Location: National Gallery; London

Holy Family with a Shepherd is an oil on canvas painting by Titian, from c. 1510. It is held in the National Gallery, in London. It has also previously been attributed to Anthony van Dyck, who produced a drawing copying it. After passing through other private collections, it was bequeathed to the National Gallery by William Holwell Carr in 1831.

== Description ==
In an idyllic country landscape, the Holy Family is seated in repose, and it offers the Child Jesus to the adoration of a young shepherd, placed with his back to them and with his head seen in profile to the right. Titian depicts the kneeling Virgin Mary holding the infant Jesus in a manger, where he is lying, and holds him over it. St. Joseph holds Jesus' feet in his right hand, presenting his son to the kneeling shepherd. In the background, on the right, is depicted, with the appearance of an angel, the scene of the announcement to the shepherds and, behind the Virgin Mary, are shown the ox and donkey of the nativity. For this reason, despite the traditional title, the most fitting subject is that it is part of the Adoration of the Shepherds.

The figures lack anatomical accuracy. St. Joseph's head is large in relation to his body, and the base of his head is unnatural. The Virgin's head is small, and her body, covered by the drapery, is almost invisible. These details show that Titian was not yet trained in the human figure, and suggest that this is one of his earliest works.

The painting shows the influence of Giovanni Bellini, but its meditative style and atmospheric landscape are more closely associated with Giorgione, especially the dark bank at the left with its silhouettes of shrubs and weeds against the dawn sky, a setting often used by him. The style of the figures and the drapery is more monumental and daring than in Giorgione's work.

== See also ==
- List of works by Titian

== Bibliography ==
- Francesco Valcanover, L'opera completa di Tiziano, Milan, Rizzoli, 1969 (Italian).
