= The Baptism of Christ (Donatello) =

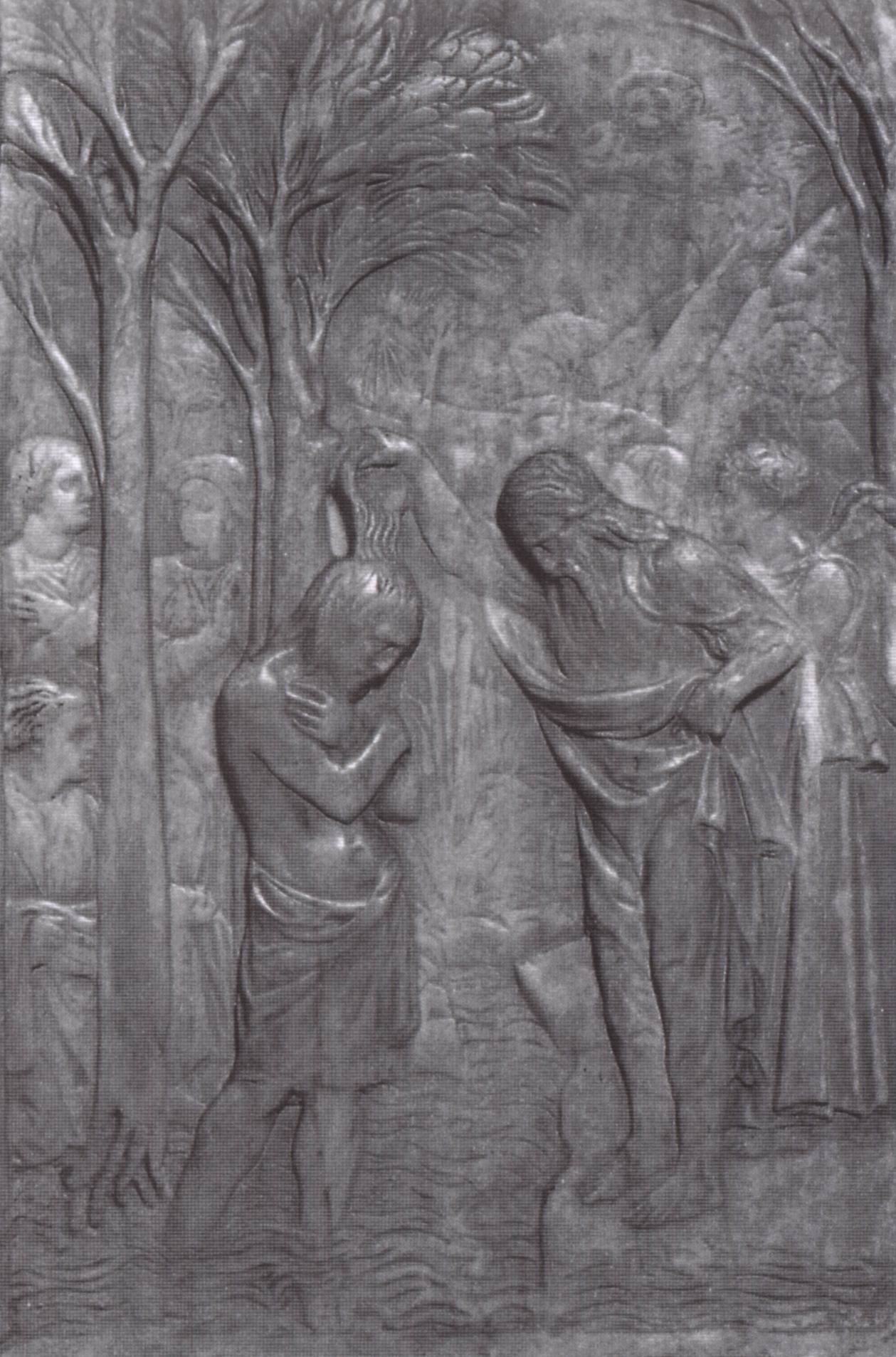
- Artist: Donatello and studio
- Medium: Marble relief sculpture
- Location: Arezzo Cathedral

Baptism of Christ is a rectangular stiacciato marble relief of the Baptism of Christ, showing a crowd in the background, including a servant holding a towel to the left and an angel to the right. It measures 63.5 by 40.5 cm and dates to 1425, forming part of the decoration of the font in Arezzo Cathedral.

Vasari's Lives of the Artists attributes it to a student from Donatello's studio, but art critics since the early 20th century have compared it with Donatello's autograph works and began more and more to include it among them, although not unanimously. The figure of Christ and the trees are strongly carved and definitely held to be by the master's hand, though St John the Baptist's legs and other areas are more schematic and may be the work of pupils.
