= Baptism of Christ (Bellini) =

Painting by Giovanni Bellini

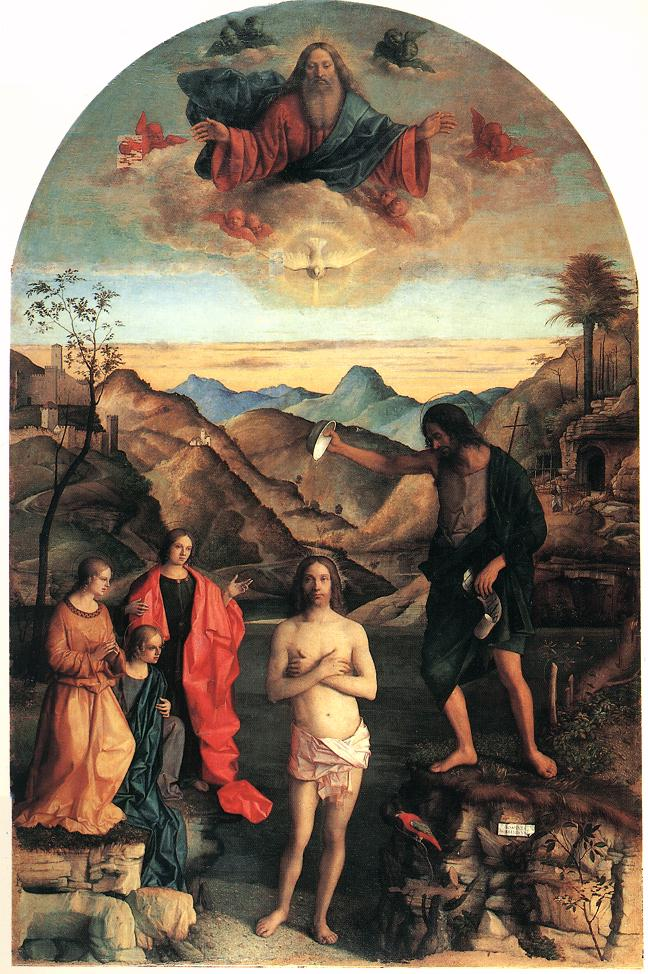
- Artist: Giovanni Bellini
- Year: 1500–1502
- Medium: tempera on panel
- Dimensions: 400 cm × 263 cm (160 in × 104 in)
- Location: Chiesa di Santa Corona, Vicenza

Baptism of Christ is a tempera painting on panel by the Italian Renaissance master Giovanni Bellini, dating to 1500–1502, and now located in the Chiesa di Santa Corona in Vicenza. It is signed IOANNES / BELLINVS on a rock in the lower left.

== Description and style ==
The work is among the first produced by the artist to show an immersive tranquility of the figures in the space that surrounds them and envelopes them in light and atmosphere. These elements suggest that the painter was possibly helped by a young Giorgione, or perhaps another student close to Bellini, at least according to the information provided by Vasari.

The painting depicts the baptism of Christ in a fairly traditional composition, with Jesus at the center turned toward the viewer, while John the Baptist, at left, baptizes him on a cliff and at right three angelic figures with gaudy dress (allegories of the three theological virtues) await. On high, the figure of God the Father appears among cherubs and seraphim, which sends forth the dove of the Holy Spirit.

The three feminine figures are also recall the angelic figures that are placed at the side of the baptized Christ, in traditional icons. The gilt line of the early dawn on the bottom semantically marks the desired territory of the divine. The man who is not the ordered center of the universe commands but constitutes all that lives in harmony.

Some have attributed the angel in red to the hand of Giorgione. The hut on high and to the right symbolizes the Old Testament; at left, on the summit of the hills, the castle symbolizes the New Testament.

As in traditional iconography, the water of the river stops at the feet of Christ, to avoid depicting his reflection (in icons, reflections aren't emitted from divine figures). Another symbolic element is the little red parrot, symbol of the Passion of Christ.

The altarpiece is notable for the smoothness of tones that tie together the landscape and the sky, that muffles the surroundings of the enveloped figures, in a surprising anticipation of the tonalism that later paintings of Giorgione and Titian would display. The landscape is ample and reposed. From the sky falls a warm light that suggests the valleys around the River Jordan. As has been said, "The colors obtain the density of a breath that comes from the depths". "The personalities, in natural dimensions, pull the spectator into the scene, miraculously in equilibrium between the spectacle of nature and the contemplation of mystery".

== See also ==
- List of works by Giovanni Bellini

== Bibliography ==
- Simona Ciofetta, Il "Battesimo di Cristo" di Giovanni Bellini in Santa Corona a Vicenza. Patronato e devozione privata, in "Venezia Cinquecento", 2, 1992, pp. 61–88. ISSN 1825-4799
- Pierluigi De Vecchi and Elda Cerchiari, I tempi dell'arte, volume 2, Bompiani, Milano 1999. ISBN 88-451-7212-0
