= Baptism of Christ (Perugino, Città della Pieve) =

Painting by Pietro Perugino

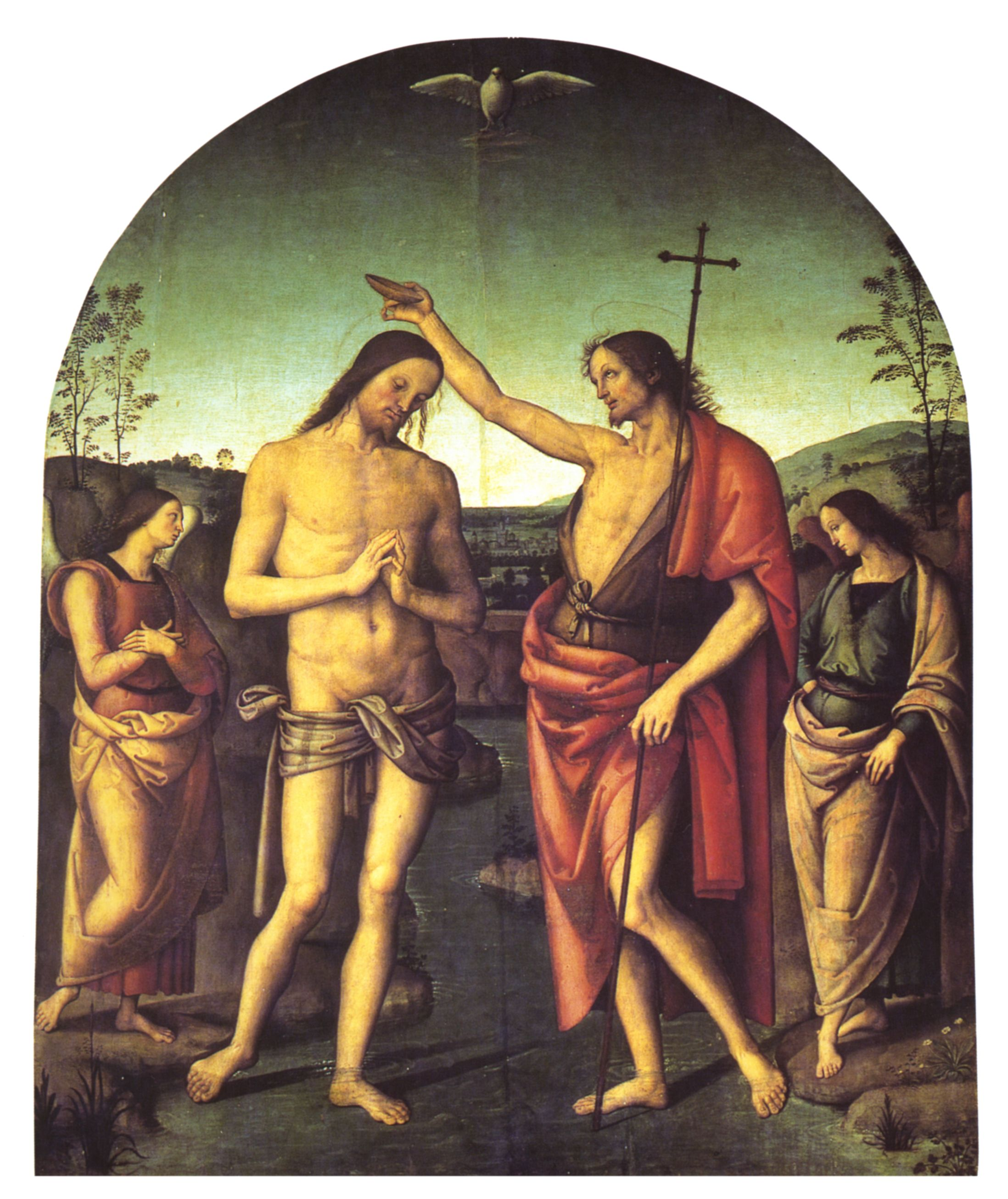
- Artist: Pietro Perugino
- Year: c.1510
- Medium: oil on panel
- Location: Città della Pieve Cathedral

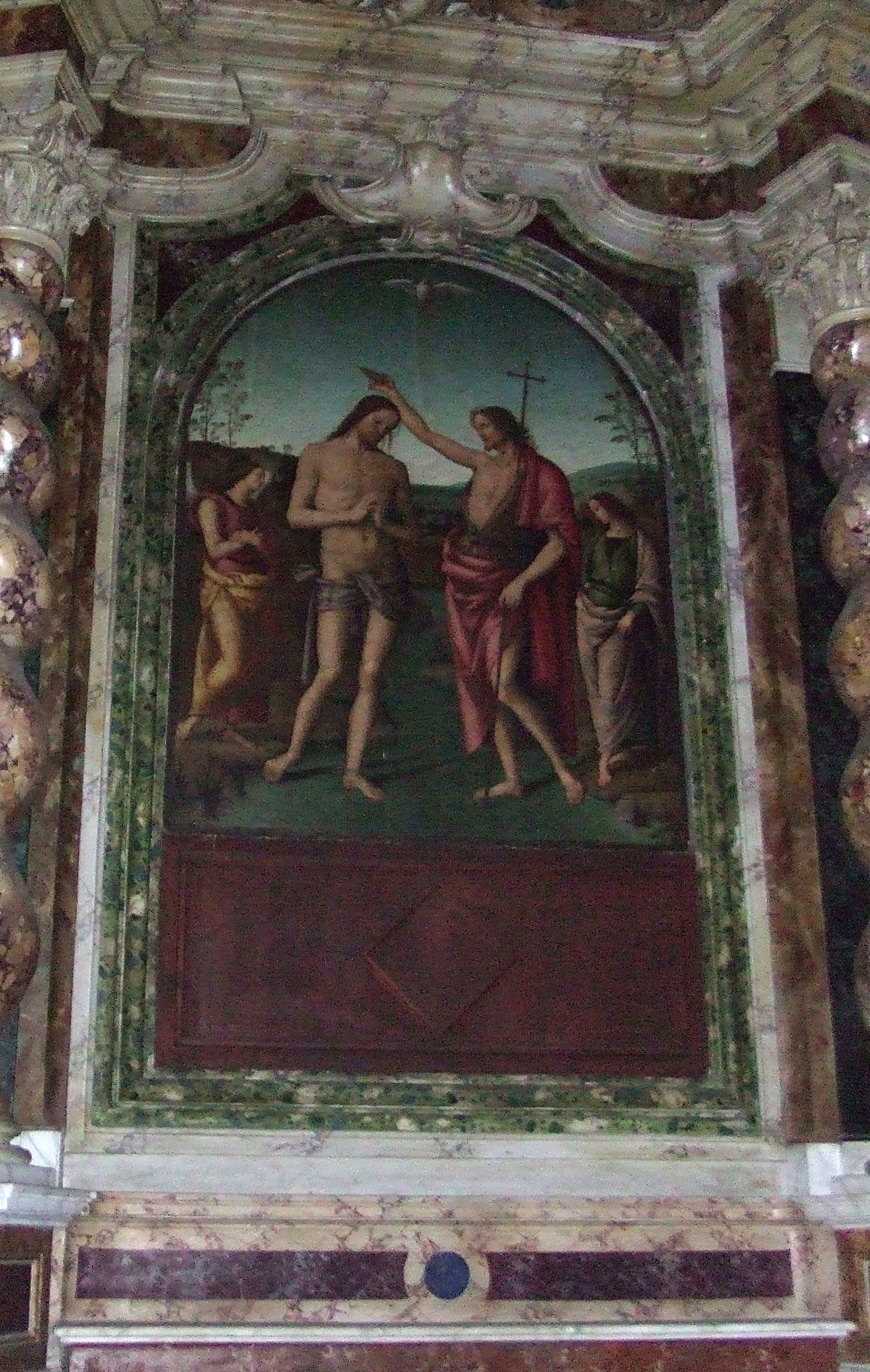
The painting in situ

Baptism of Christ is a c.1510 painting of the Baptism of Christ by Pietro Perugino. He produced it for the chapel of St John the Baptist in Città della Pieve Cathedral, where it still hangs. Unusually for a depiction of this subject, it does not show the face of God the Father. A multi-coloured marble frame was added in the Baroque period and a copy of Perugino's self-portrait now hangs another wall in the chapel.

It was restored in 1821 by Colarieti Tosti, in 1962 by Giovanni Mancini and finally in 2010. It has not been kept in the best environmental conditions and the wood has started to crack and the colours to peel and lift.

== Bibliography ==
- (in Italian) Vittoria Garibaldi, Perugino, in Pittori del Rinascimento, Scala, Florence, 2004 ISBN 88-8117-099-X
- (in Italian) Pierluigi De Vecchi, Elda Cerchiari, I tempi dell'arte, volume 2, Bompiani, Milan, 1999 ISBN 88-451-7212-0
