= Baptism of Christ (El Greco, Heraklion) =

Painting by El Greco

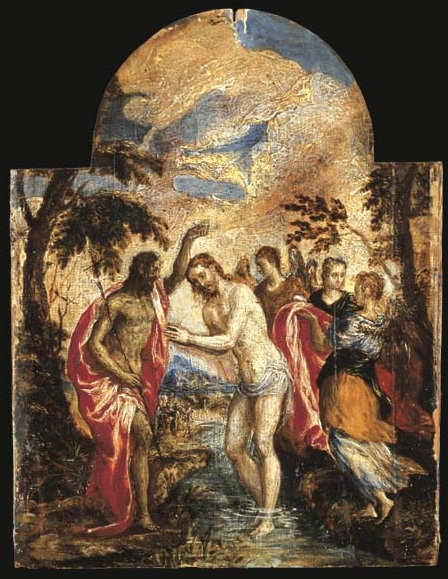
- Artist: El Greco
- Year: c. 1567–1569
- Medium: egg tempera and oil on wood
- Dimensions: 23.5 cm × 18.1 cm (9.3 in × 7.1 in)
- Location: Historical Museum of Crete, Heraklion

Baptism of Christ is a 1567–1569 painting by El Greco. It is now in the Historical Museum of Crete in Heraklion.

The painting closely resembles El Greco's The Baptism of Christ panel of his Modena Triptych (1568).

== See also ==
- List of works by El Greco
