= The Tears of Saint Peter =

The Tears of Saint Peter may refer to:

- The Tears of Saint Peter (El Greco, Barnard Castle)
- The Tears of Saint Peter (El Greco, Mexico City)
- The Tears of Saint Peter (El Greco, Oslo)
- The Tears of Saint Peter (El Greco, San Diego)
- The Tears of Saint Peter (El Greco and studio, Sitges)
- In Toledo: The Tears of Saint Peter (El Greco and studio, El Greco Museum)
- In Toledo: The Tears of Saint Peter (El Greco, Lerma Museum Foundation)
- The Tears of Saint Peter (El Greco, Washington)

== See also ==
- Saint Peter in Penitence (Ribera)
