= Portrait of a Clergyman (attributed to El Greco) =

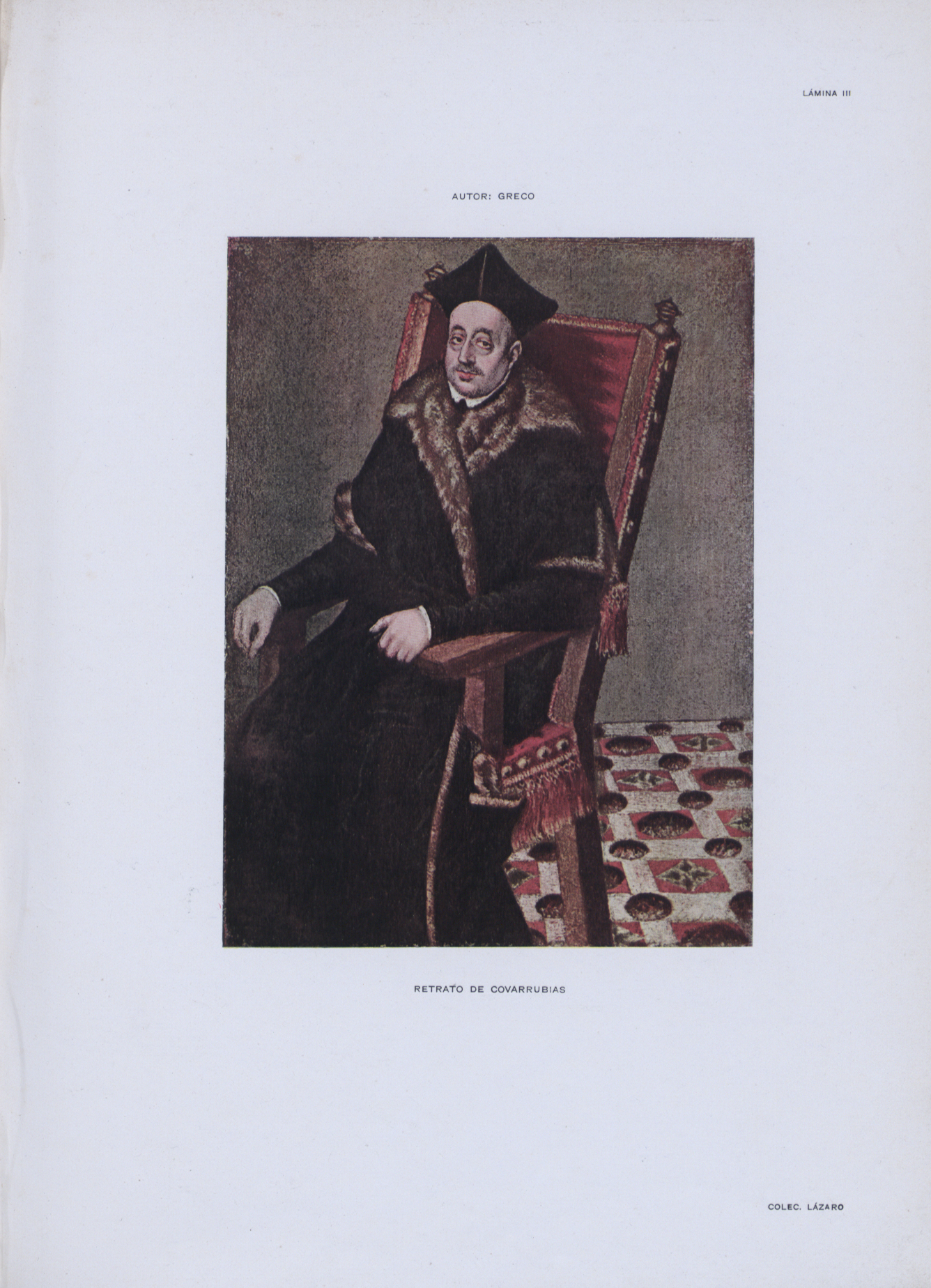

Portrait of a Clergyman is a 1577 oil on paper miniature painting, attributing by many art historians to El Greco, making it one of few works in that format generally included in his corpus. It is X-201 in Harold Wethey's catalogue raisonné of El Greco's works.

Some art historians identify the subject as Diego de Covarrubias as the figure's appearance is similar to that of Portrait of Diego de Covarrubias. He died the same year as El Greco arrived in Toledo.

Mayer and Camón Aznar ascribe it to El Greco. Ezquerra del Bayo called it Portrait of Covarrubias in his Exposición de la miniatura-retrato en España: catálogo general ilustrado (1916) and ascribed it to El Greco. Wethey doubted the work was by El Greco and instead assigned it to the late 16th century Spanish school.

== See also ==
- List of works by El Greco

== Bibliography (in Spanish) ==
- Frati, Tiziana (1970). La obra pictórica completa del Greco. Barcelona-Milán: Noguer-Rizzoli.
- Gudiol, José (1982). Doménikos Theotokópoulos, el Greco (1541-1614). Barcelona: Poligrafía.
- Wethey, Harold Edwin (1968). El Greco y su escuela. Vol. II. Translated by Carlos Cid Priego. Madrid: Guadarrama.
