= The Tears of Saint Peter (El Greco and studio, El Greco Museum) =

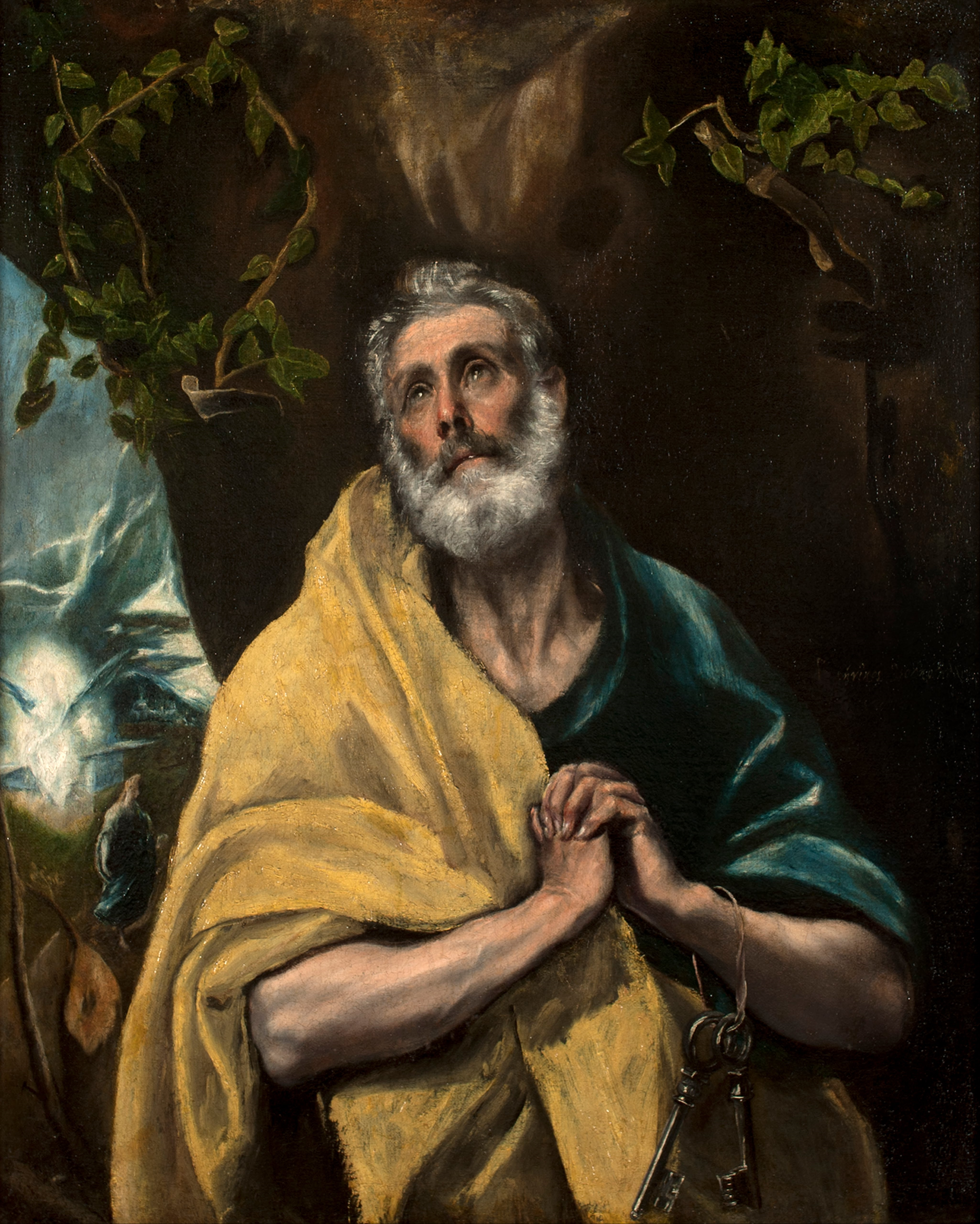

The Tears of Saint Peter is a c.1595-1600 oil on canvas painting now in the El Greco Museum, Toledo. It is signed doménikos theotokópolis (sic) e`poiei. It is X-433 in Harold Wethey's catalogue raisonné and 64-g in Tiziana Frati's.

Cossío, Mayer and Camón Aznar attribute it to El Greco, whilst Halldor Soehner argues it is a repainted autograph work or a good studio work. According to Wethey it is the best studio treatment of the theme but it is not in a good condition and has been overpainted.

Variants of the work are:

- The Tears of Saint Peter (El Greco, Barnard Castle)
- The Tears of Saint Peter (El Greco, Oslo)
- The Tears of Saint Peter (El Greco, Mexico City)
- The Tears of Saint Peter (El Greco and studio, Sitges)
- The Tears of Saint Peter (El Greco and studio, El Greco Museum)
- The Tears of Saint Peter (El Greco, Washington)
- The Tears of Saint Peter (El Greco, Lerma Museum Foundation)
- The Tears of Saint Peter (El Greco, San Diego)

== Provenance ==
1. Taladriz, Valladolid
2. Benigno de la vega Inclán, Toledo

== See also ==
- List of works by El Greco
