= The Tears of Saint Peter (El Greco and studio, Sitges) =

The Tears of Saint Peter is a c.1595–1600 oil on canvas painting signed doménikos theotokópolis (sic) e`poiei;. Now in the Museo Cau Ferrat in Sitges, it is similar to the El Greco Museum version.

It is attributed to El Greco himself by Cossío, Mayer and Camón Aznar. According to Halldor Soehner and the Cau Ferrat catalogue of 1942 it is a studio work and according to Harold Wethey it is from the school of El Greco. It is X-434 in Wethey's catalogue raisonné and 64-h in Tiziana Frati's.

Variants of the work are:

- The Tears of Saint Peter (El Greco, Barnard Castle)
- The Tears of Saint Peter (El Greco, Oslo)
- The Tears of Saint Peter (El Greco, Mexico City)
- The Tears of Saint Peter (El Greco and studio, El Greco Museum)
- The Tears of Saint Peter (El Greco, Washington)
- The Tears of Saint Peter (El Greco, Lerma Museum Foundation)
- The Tears of Saint Peter (El Greco, San Diego)

== Provenance ==
1. Arte dealer in Paris (1894)
2. Santiago Rusiñol Prats

== See also ==
- List of works by El Greco
