= Portrait of a Clergyman =

Portrait of a Clergyman may refer to:

- Portrait of a Clergyman (attributed to El Greco)
- Portrait of a Clergyman (de Ville)
