= Adoration of the Magi (El Greco, 1568) =

Paintings by El Greco

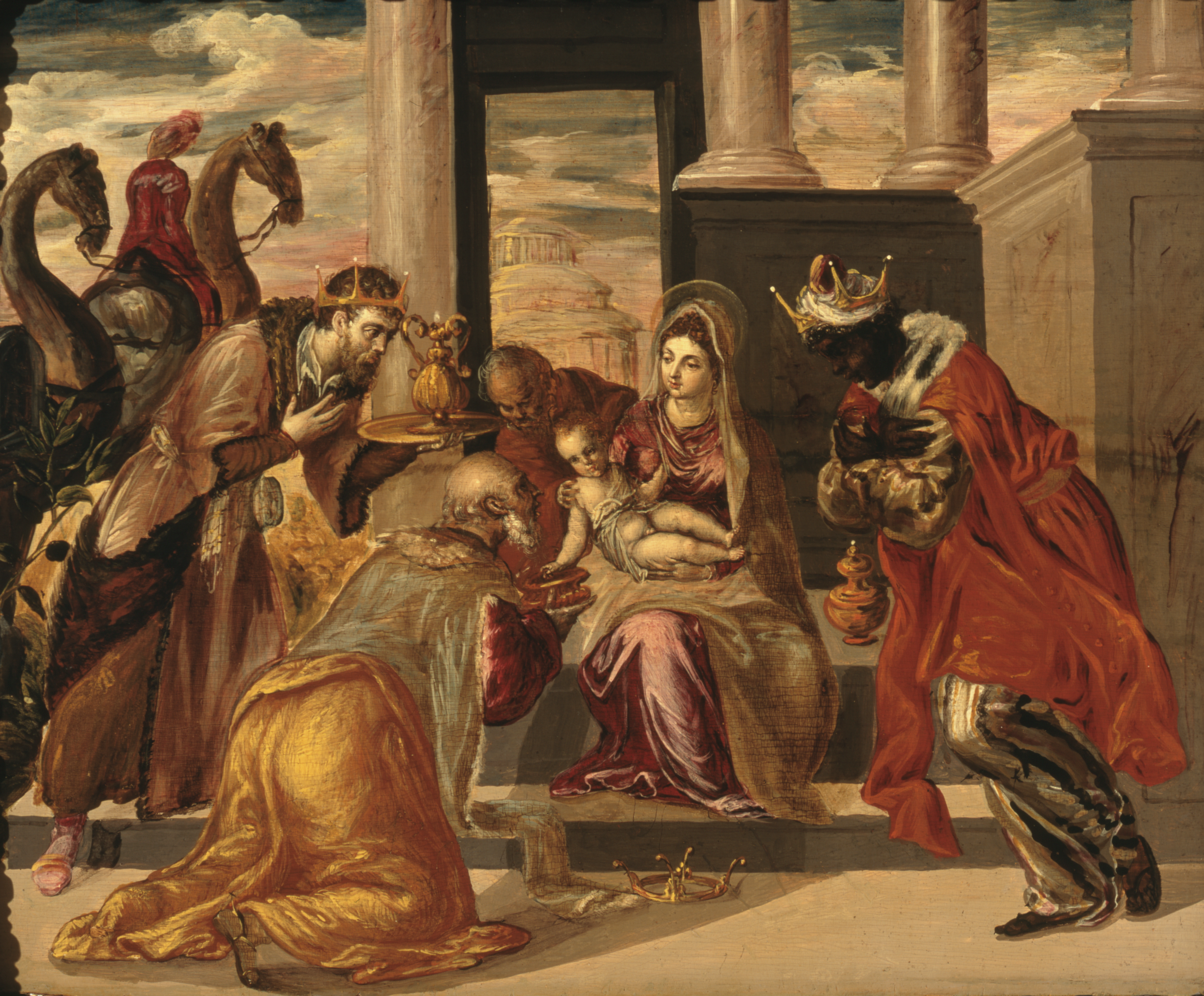
Mexico City version

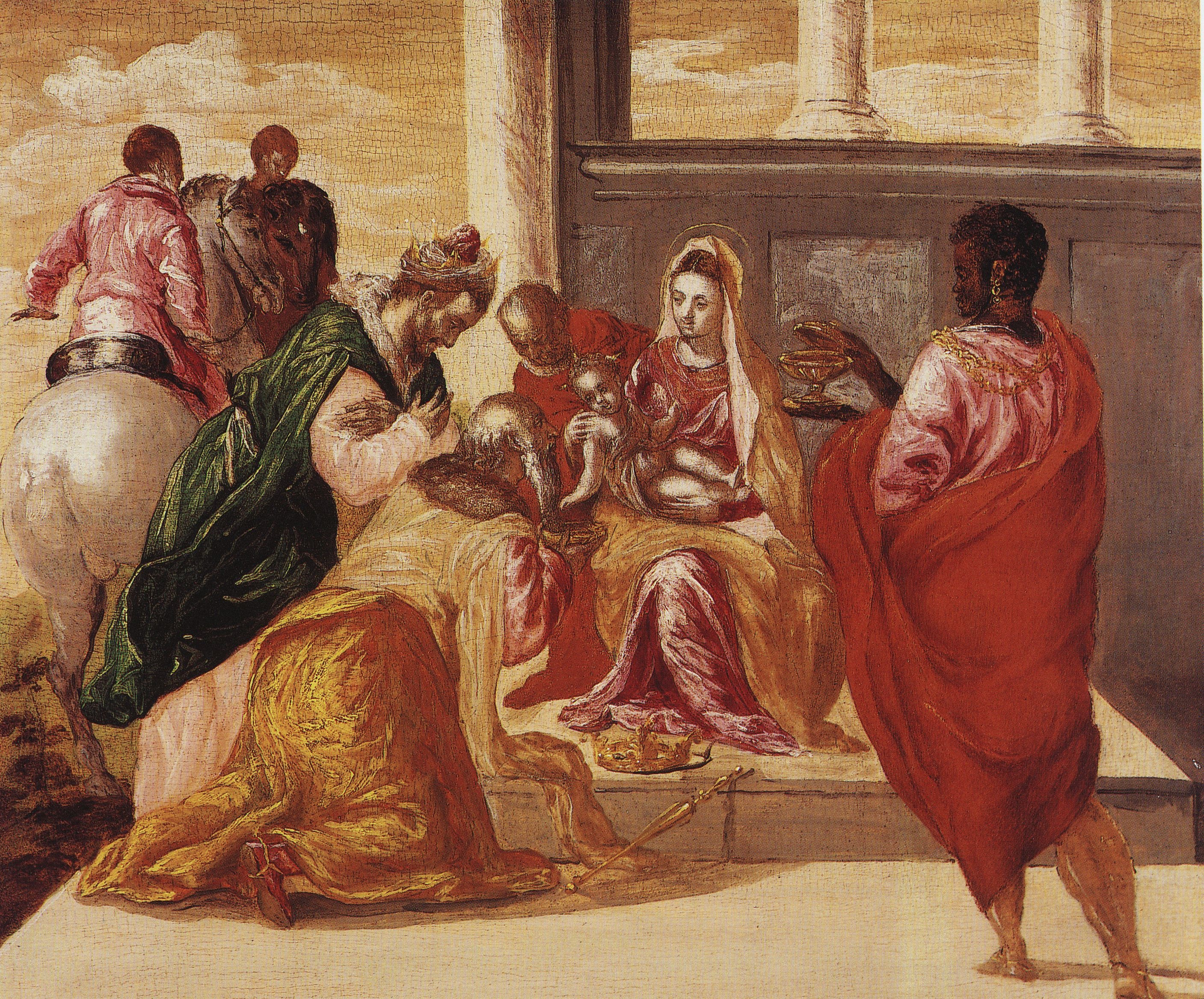
Madrid version

Adoration of the Magi refers to two oil on canvas paintings by El Greco, both probably painted in 1568 or 1569. One is in the Museo Soumaya in Mexico City and the other in the Museo Lázaro Galdiano in Madrid, referred to as X-2 and X-3 respectively in Harold Wethey's catalogue raisonné of the artist's work.

This era of the artist's oeuvre synthesised the Byzantine, Venetian and Sienese traditions of painting and combined them with Counter-Reformation iconography, which would later become evident in Toledo. The colours in particular show a clear influence from Venetian Mannerism.

== Bibliography ==
- Wethey, Harold; El Greco y su Escuela (Volumen-II) ; Ediciones Guadarrama; Madrid-1967
- (in Spanish) Pita Andrade, José Manuel; La "Adoración de los pastores" de El Museo del Prado, dentro del libro "El Greco"; Círculo de Lectores; ISBN 978-84-8109-459-6
