= The Tears of Saint Peter (El Greco, San Diego) =

Painting by El Greco

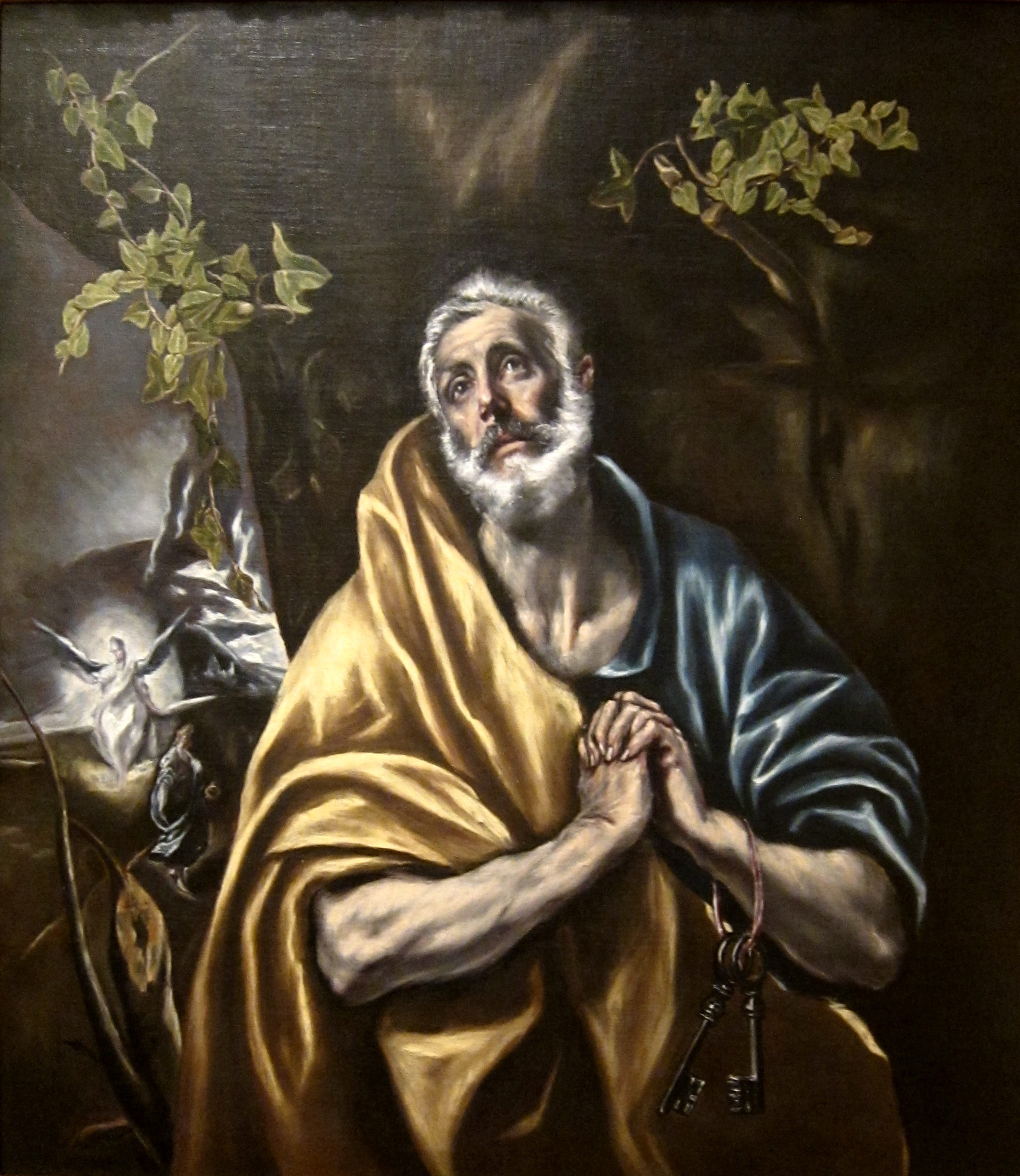
- Artist: El Greco
- Year: c. 1590–1595
- Subject: Saint Peter
- Location: San Diego Museum of Art, San Diego, California, U.S.

The Tears of Saint Peter, or The Penitent Saint Peter, is an oil painting on canvas of c. 1590–1595 by El Greco, now catalogue number 1940.76 in the San Diego Museum of Art, which it entered in 1940. It is signed δομήνικος θεοτοκóπουλος ε´ποíει. Later than the Barnard Castle version of the same subject, it is number 270 in the catalogue raisonné by Harold Wethey and 64-b in that of Tiziana Frati.

Variants of the work are:

- The Tears of Saint Peter (El Greco, Barnard Castle)
- The Tears of Saint Peter (El Greco, Oslo)
- The Tears of Saint Peter (El Greco, Mexico City)
- The Tears of Saint Peter (El Greco and studio, Sitges)
- The Tears of Saint Peter (El Greco and studio, El Greco Museum)
- The Tears of Saint Peter (El Greco, Washington)
- The Tears of Saint Peter (El Greco, Lerma Museum Foundation)

== Provenance ==
1. José María de Zavala, Vitoria (1908 – c. 1926)
2. Pedro y Antonio Verástegui, Vitoria (c. 1926 – 1929)
3. Jacob Hirsch, New York (1939)
4. Anne R. and Amy Putnam, San Diego, California (1940–1940)
5. San Diego Museum of Art (1940)

== See also ==
- List of works by El Greco
