= The Tears of Saint Peter (El Greco, Lerma Museum Foundation) =

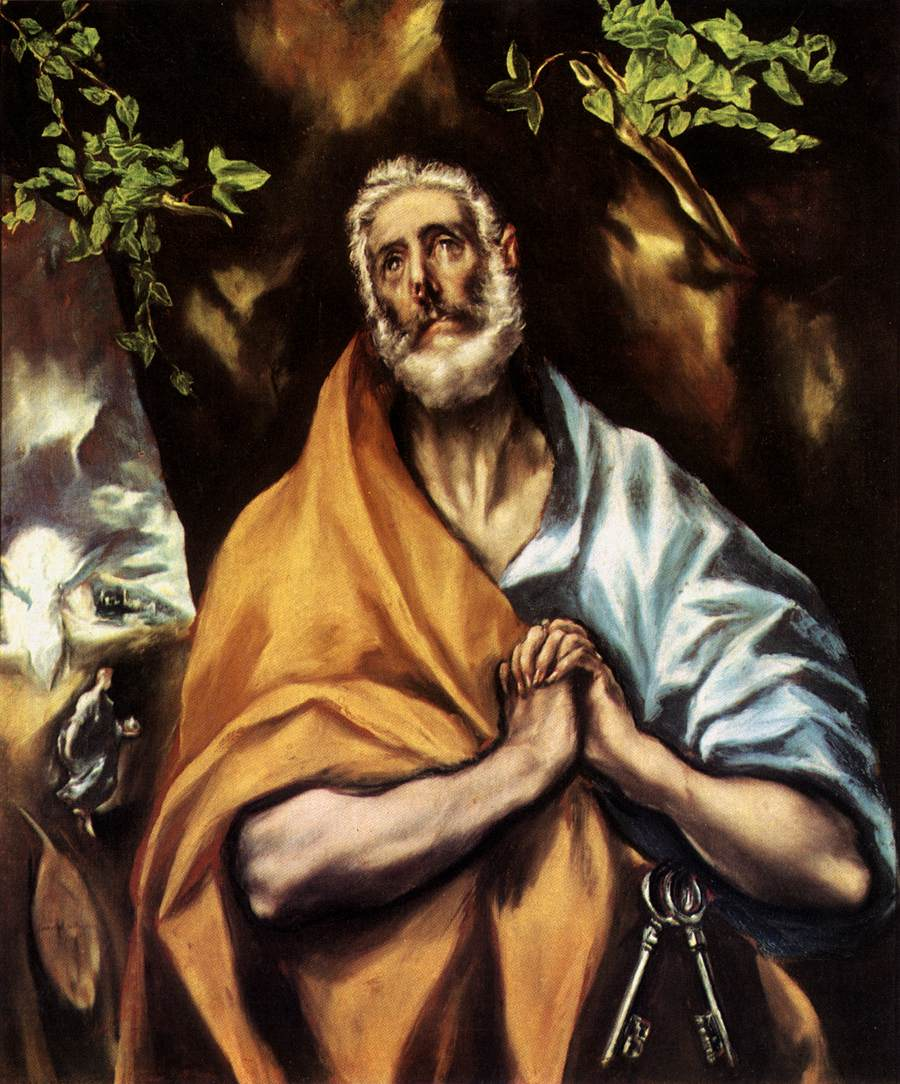

The Tears of Saint Peter is a c.1605-1610 oil on canvas painting by El Greco, now in the Hospital de Tavera in Toledo, Spain. It is signed δομήνικος θεοτοκóπουλος ε´ποíει;.

The first documentary mention of it is in a Hospital de Tavera inventory from 1672. It is number 273 in the Harold Wethey catalogue raisonné and 64-e in Tiziana Frati's.

Variants of the work are:

- The Tears of Saint Peter (El Greco, Barnard Castle)
- The Tears of Saint Peter (El Greco, Oslo)
- The Tears of Saint Peter (El Greco, Mexico City)
- The Tears of Saint Peter (El Greco and studio, Sitges)
- The Tears of Saint Peter (El Greco and studio, El Greco Museum)
- The Tears of Saint Peter (El Greco, Washington)
- The Tears of Saint Peter (El Greco, Lerma Museum Foundation)
- The Tears of Saint Peter (El Greco, San Diego)

== See also ==
- List of works by El Greco
