= Saint Peter in Penitence (Ribera) =

1630s painting by Jusepe de Ribera

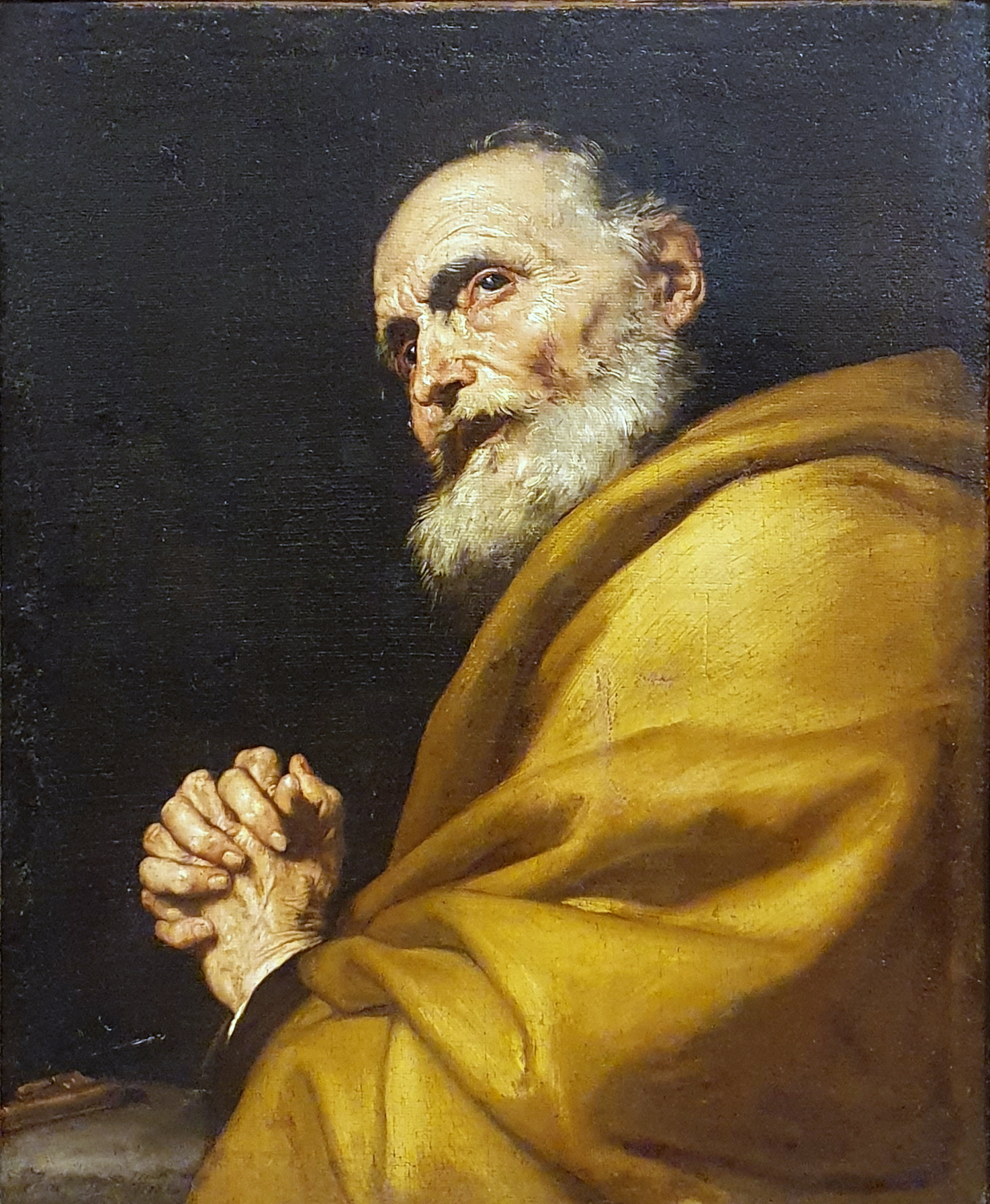
Saint Peter in Penitence (c. 1630–1640) by Jusepe de Ribera

Saint Peter in Penitence or The Penitent Saint Peter is a 1630s painting of Peter the Apostle by Jusepe de Ribera, now in the Museo Soumaya in Mexico City.

== Sources ==
- (in Spanish) Seis siglos de arte. Cien grandes maestros. México: Museo Soumaya-Fundación Carlso. 2006. p. 37. ISBN 968-7794-30-5.
- (in Spanish) Camón Aznar, José (1999). Summa Artis. Historial general del arte. XXIV. Pintura española del siglo XVI (8a. edición). Madrid: Espasa-Calpe. p. 101.
