= Portrait of Diego de Covarrubias =

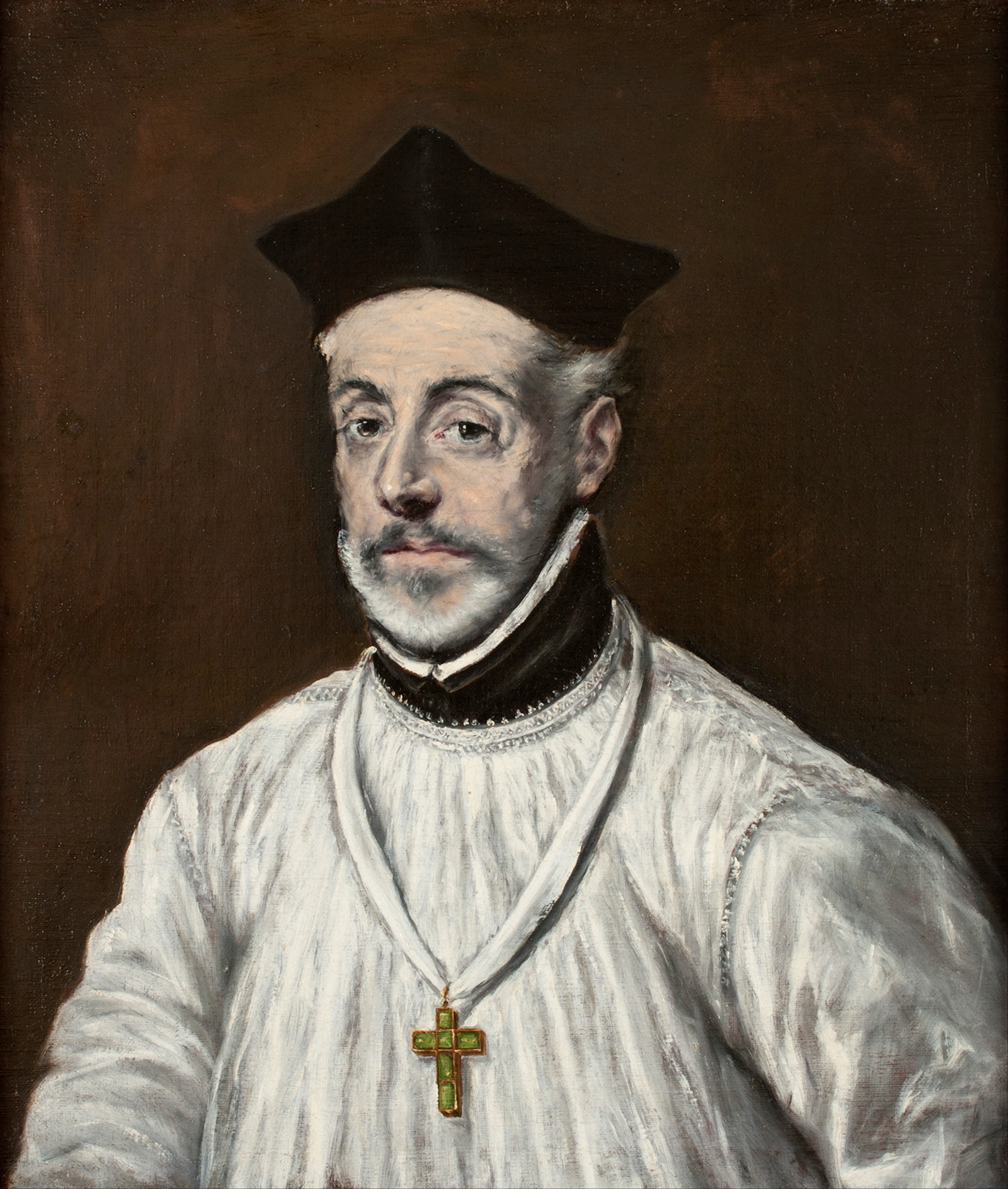

Portrait of Diego de Covarrubias y Leiva is a c.1600 oil on canvas painting by El Greco, now in the El Greco Museum in Toledo. It appears in Harold Wethey's catalogue raisonné of the artist's works as number 137 and in Tiziana Frati's as number 114;

The artist arrived in Toledo in 1577, the year Diego de Covarrubias died, so the work cannot be from life but is instead based on Sánchez Coello's 1574 portrait of him. He may also be one of the figures in The Burial of the Count of Orgaz, in which case it may be a kind of posthumous tribute.

It appears to be a pendent of Portrait of Antonio de Covarrubias (Wethey number 136) - in both works the only autograph section seems to be the head, with the rest being by his studio. Both were probably in Pedro de Salazar y Mendoza's collection according to a 1629 inventory. It was later in Toledo's provincial library. Wethey also mentions a copy (X-163), formerly in Toledo Provincial Museum but now in an unknown location.

== See also ==
- List of works by El Greco

== Bibliography (in Spanish) ==
- Cossío, Manuel Bartolomé (2016). El Greco de Cossío. Zaragoza: Lecturas hispánicas.
- Frati, Tiziana (1970). La obra pictórica completa de El Greco. Barcelona-Milán: Noguer-Rizzoli.
- Gudiol, José (1982). Doménikos Theotokópoulos, el Greco (1541-1614). Barcelona: Poligrafía.
- Wethey, Harold Edwin (1968). El Greco y su escuela. Vol. II. Translated by Carlos Cid Priego. Madrid: Guadarrama.
- Marañón, Gregorio (2014). El Greco y Toledo. RBA.
- Marías, Fernando (2013). El Greco. Historia de un pintor extravagante. Nerea.
