= The Tears of Saint Peter (El Greco, Washington) =

Painting by El Greco in the Phillips Collection

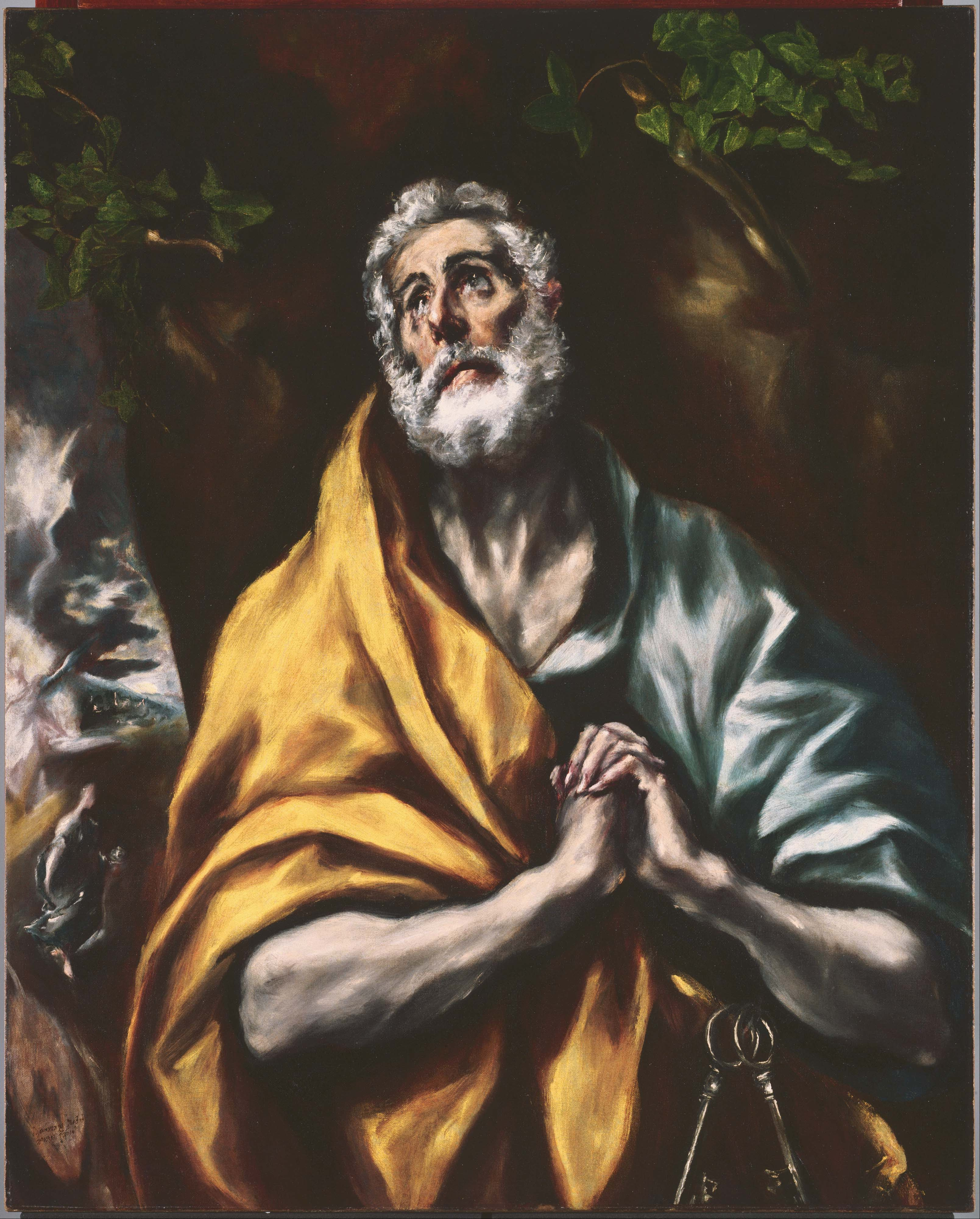

The Tears of Saint Peter is a c.1600-1605 oil on canvas painting by El Greco, now in the Phillips Collection in Washington D. C. It is in Harold Wethey's catalogue raisonné as number 271 and Tiziana Frati's as 64-c. Its appearance and dimensions are similar to the studio version now in Sitges.

Variants of the work are:

- The Tears of Saint Peter (El Greco, Barnard Castle)
- The Tears of Saint Peter (El Greco, Oslo)
- The Tears of Saint Peter (El Greco, Mexico City)
- The Tears of Saint Peter (El Greco and studio, Sitges)
- The Tears of Saint Peter (El Greco and studio, El Greco Museum)
- The Tears of Saint Peter (El Greco, Washington)
- The Tears of Saint Peter (El Greco, Lerma Museum Foundation)
- The Tears of Saint Peter (El Greco, San Diego)

== Provenance ==
1. Guillermo de Guillén García, Barcelona
2. Museu Nacional d'Art de Catalunya, Barcelona (deposited, 1906)
3. Ignacio Zuloaga, Zumaya
4. Ivan Chtchoukine, Paris (1908)
5. Heilbuth Collection, Copenhagen (1920)

== See also ==
- List of works by El Greco
