= Joaquín Ezquerra del Bayo (1863-1942) =

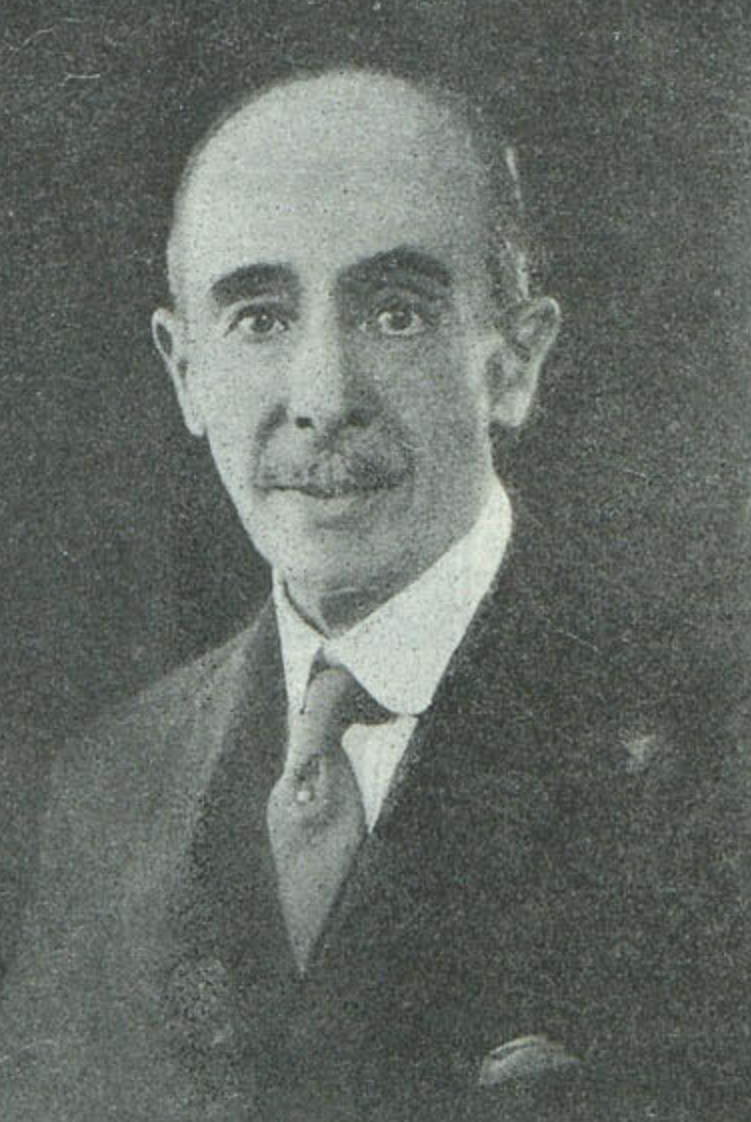
Retrato de Joaquín Ezquerra del Bayo

Joaquín Ezquerra del Bayo y García de Valladolid (11 December 1863 - 17 May 1942) was a Spanish art historian and museum worker, specialising in the 18th century.

== Life ==
Born in Manila, he was a grandson of the engineer and geologist Joaquín Ezquerra del Bayo. He graduated in pharmacy (following his family's scientific tradition) from the Central University of Madrid in 1884.

He was a member of the board of directors of Sociedad Española de Amigos del Arte and director of the Arte Español review as well as writing several articles for it. After curating several highly successful exhibitions for the association, his best-known project began in 1918, when Spain's Ministry of Public Works commissioned the Society to restore the Moncloa Palace. In collaboration with the garden designer Javier Winthuysen Losada, Ezquerra del Bayo curated the palace's artworks and furnishing, restoring it to its original neoclassical appearance and reopening on 20 June 1929.

In 1929 he was appointed a full member of the Real Academia de Bellas Artes de San Fernando. He died in Madrid.

== Works ==
- Exposición de la miniatura-retrato en España: catálogo general ilustrado (1916).
- Exposición de el abanico en España : catálogo general ilustrado (1920).
- Catálogo de las miniaturas y pequeños retratos pertenecientes al Excmo. Sr. duque de Berwick y de Alba (1924).
- Retratos de mujeres españolas del siglo XIX (1924, with Luis Pérez Bueno).
- Exposición de retratos de niño en España: catálogo general ilustrado (1925).
- Casas reales de España, retratos de niños (1926, with Francisco Javier Sánchez Cantón).
- La duquesa de Alba y Goya, estudio biográfico y artístico (1928).
- El palacete de la Moncloa, su pasado y presente (1929).
- Los palacetes cortesanos del siglo XVIII (1929, acceptance speech at the Real Academia de Bellas Artes).
- Retratos de la familia Téllez-Girón, novenos duques de Osuna (1934).
- Recuerdos de un caballero paje de Carlos IV (1944, published posthumously in the bulletin of the Real Academia de la Historia).

Preceded by Rodrigo de Figueroa y Torres	Real Academia de Bellas Artes de San Fernando; Medal 14; 1929-1942	Succeeded by José Ferrandis Torres
