= The Tears of Saint Peter (El Greco, Mexico City) =

Painting by El Greco

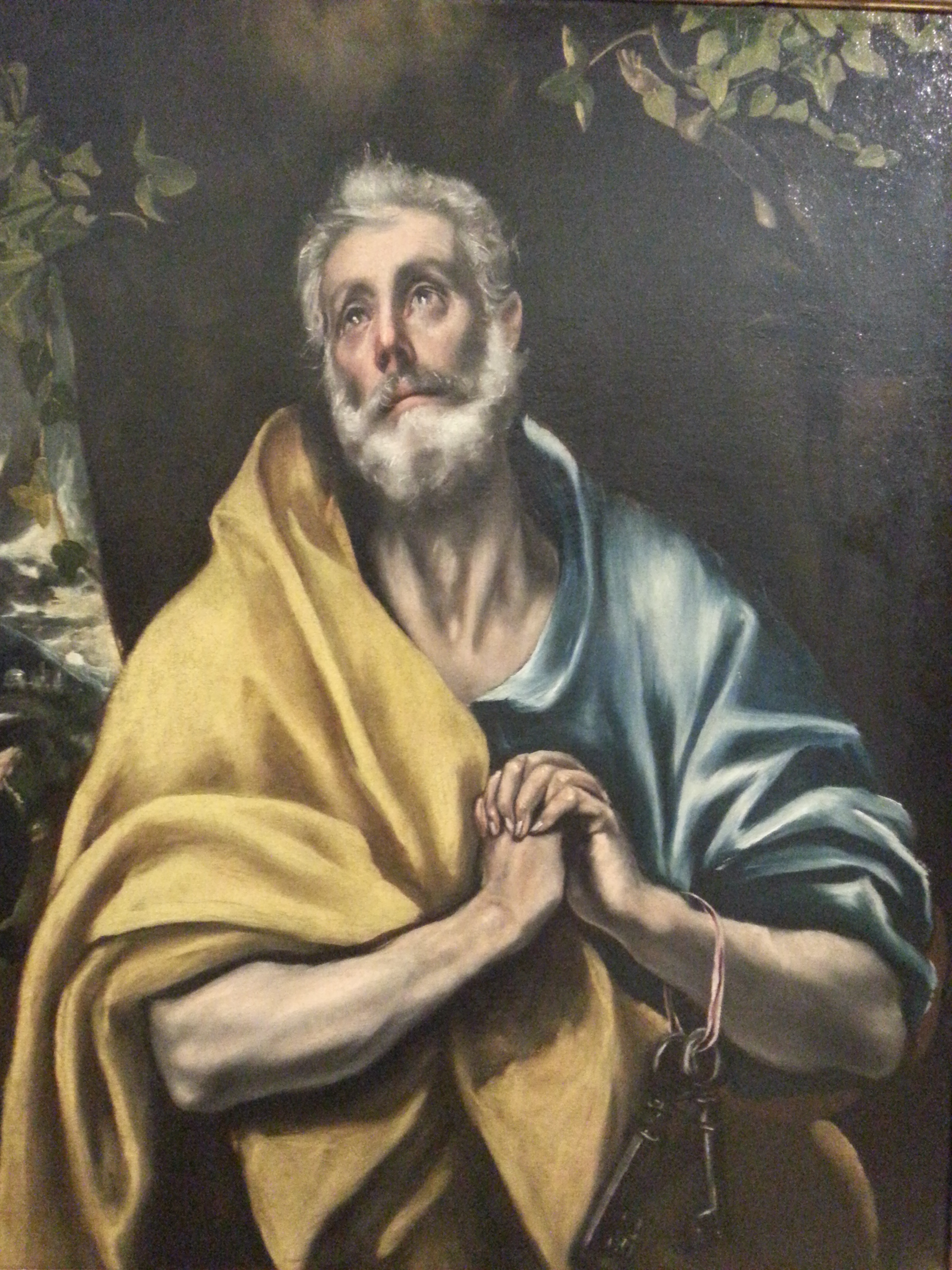
- Artist: El Greco
- Year: c.1587-1596
- Medium: oil on canvas
- Dimensions: 96.5 cm × 79 cm (38.0 in × 31 in)
- Location: Museo Soumaya, Mexico City

The Tears of Saint Peter or Penitent Saint Peter is a c.1587-1596 painting by El Greco. It is similar to other works on the same subject by the artist, such as those in the Bowes Museum, the El Greco Museum, the national museum in Stockholm and others.

This version seems to have belonged to the marqués de Legarda, who kept it in Vitoria. Electra Havemeyer acquired it in 1909 and then in 1930 by the Florida-based Cuban collector Oscar B. Cintas, who restored it. Finally it was bought in 1998 by the Museo Soumaya, where it still hangs.

Variants of the work are:

- The Tears of Saint Peter (El Greco, Barnard Castle)
- The Tears of Saint Peter (El Greco, Oslo)
- The Tears of Saint Peter (El Greco and studio, Sitges)
- The Tears of Saint Peter (El Greco and studio, El Greco Museum)
- The Tears of Saint Peter (El Greco, Washington)
- The Tears of Saint Peter (El Greco, Lerma Museum Foundation)
- The Tears of Saint Peter (El Greco, San Diego)

== See also ==
- List of works by El Greco

== Bibliography ==
- ÁLVAREZ LOPERA, José, El Greco, Madrid, Arlanza, 2005, Biblioteca «Descubrir el Arte», (colección «Grandes maestros»). ISBN 84-9550-344-1.
- SCHOLZ-HÄNSEL, Michael, El Greco, Colonia, Taschen, 2003. ISBN 978-3-8228-3173-1.
