= Palacio de La Moncloa before the Spanish Civil War =

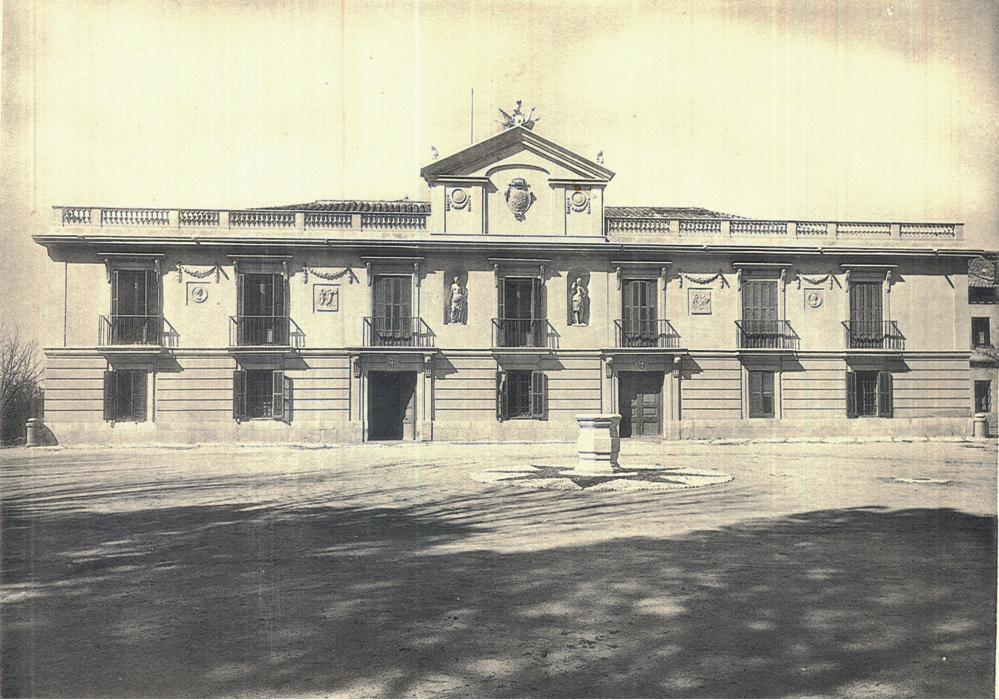
Facade of the Palacio de La Moncloa before the Spanish Civil War (1920)

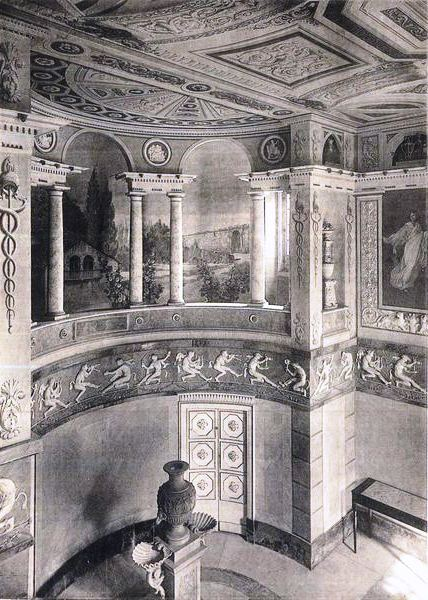
Tribune of musicians in the dining room of the Palacio de La Moncloa before the Civil War (1920)

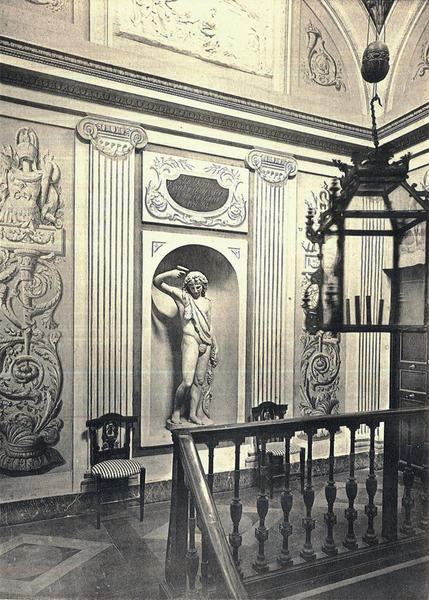
Main staircase of the Palacio de La Moncloa before the Civil War (1920)

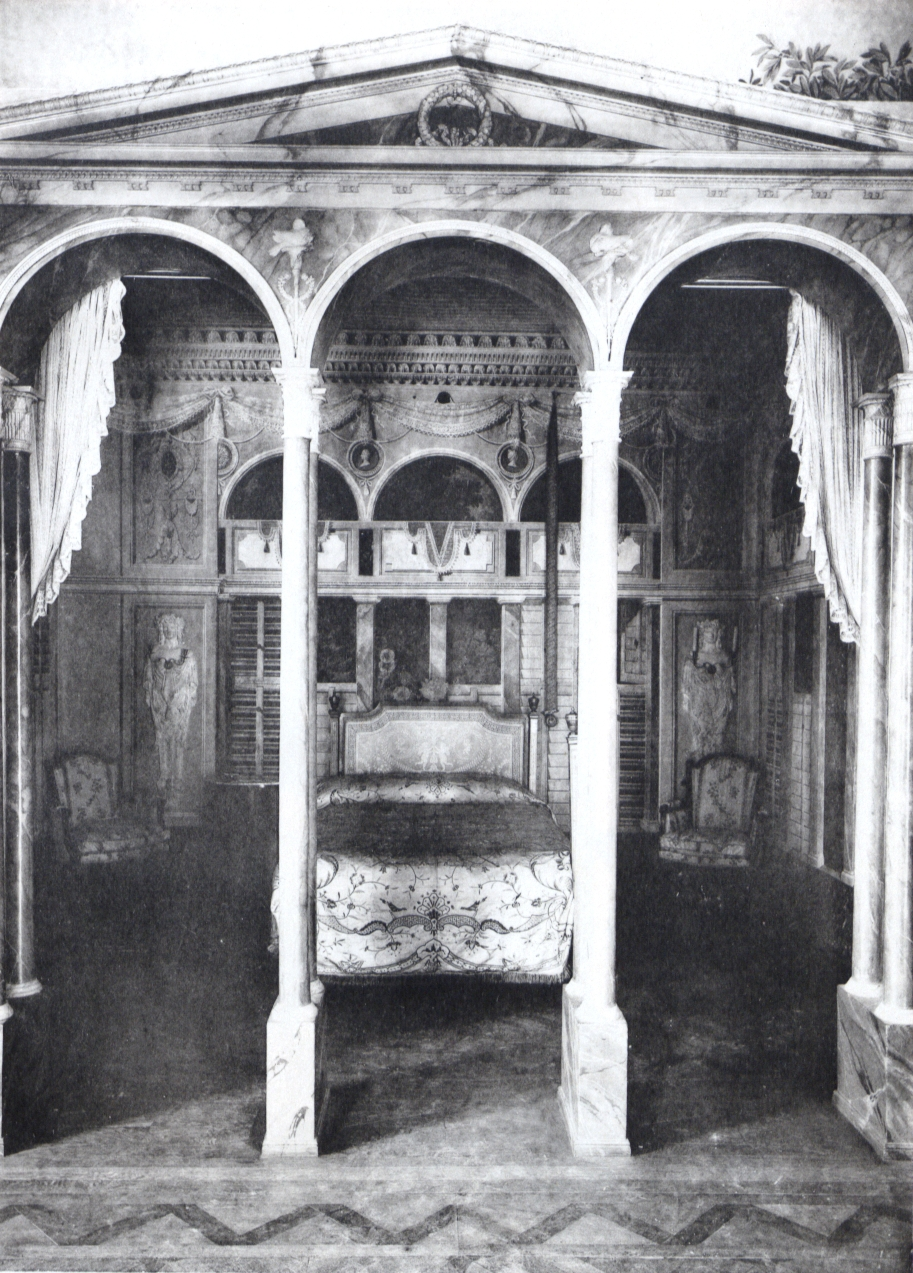
Bedchamber of the Duchess, Palacio de La Moncloa before the Civil War (1920)

The Palacio de La Moncloa before the Spanish Civil War was the original Palacio de La Moncloa before it suffered damage during the Spanish Civil War and was rebuilt into the current palace (the official residence of the Prime Minister of Spain) with a very different layout from the original.

== History ==
The current palace is on the site of an old country house located in the middle of a vast agricultural estate, which has passed between marquesses, dukes and kings. It dates back to the first third of the 17th century, when Gaspar de Haro y Guzmán, Marquess of Carpio and Eliche, took over the orchards of La Moncloa and Sora, which were located around the Cantarranas stream.

At the highest point of the land, the Marquess ordered the construction of a mansion, originally known as the Palace of Eliche and also as Casa Pintada, in reference to the frescoes that adorned the outside walls.

Little is known of the original appearance of the building, but it presumably was designed with two floors and an attic, as is clear from an appraisal conducted in the 18th century. After passing through several owners, La Moncloa was bought in 1781 by Maríana de Silva, the Duchess of Arcos, who undertook the first major reform of the palace, following the Neoclassical trends of the time.

After her death in January 1784, the estate passed to her daughter, María del Pilar Teresa Cayetana de Silva, the popular Duchess of Alba portrayed by Goya. In 1802 the Duchess died, an occasion that was used by King Charles IV to buy the property, with the intention of annexing it to the Royal Site of Florida. Five years later he would acquire and add the adjacent Dehesa de la Villa to the estate.

In 1816 the building was restored by architect Isidro González Velázquez, who proceeded to consolidate it and eliminate some ruinous elements, in addition to acting on the gardens. During the reign of Isabella II in 1846, the entire property was transferred to the Spanish state. At first it was under the jurisdiction of the Ministry of Development, until the decision was made to convert it to a museum, which was inaugurated in 1929. The adaptation works were directed by Joaquín Ezquerra del Bayo.

The Civil War (1936–1939) meant the virtual destruction of the property. Being in ruins it was finally demolished during the government of Franco. In 1955 it was rebuilt, to be used as a residence for national and foreign personalities, mainly heads of state visiting Spain. The project, signed by Diego Méndez, proposed a layout very different from the original. A new building was designed, with which the 18th-century style country house was transformed into a large palace, based on models inspired by the Casa del Labrador in Aranjuez, with touches of Austrian architecture. Elements were even borrowed from other sites, such as the twelve columns of the old courtyard (the palace's Hall of Columns), coming from the cloister of the Archbishop's Palace of Arcos de la Llana near Burgos.

With the transition to democracy, the current Palacio de La Moncloa was turned into the official residence of the Prime Minister and his family.

== Description ==
The architecture and ornamentation of the palace evolved over time, from the last third of the 18th century when it reached its peak, until its destruction in the Civil War.

The Duchess of Arcos, the owner between 1781 and 1784, put special attention on the interiors. The rooms were decorated in pseudo-classical style with abundant Pompeii and Herculaneum motifs. The stucco cabinet and dining room, presided over by a tribune of musicians, as well as the staircase that led to the upper floor correspond to this period. In the next two decades, the Duchess of Alba continued the remodel initiated by her mother, while beautifying the gardens. The Arbor Garden, the New Fountain Pond and the Barbos Pond were some of her contributions. While her greatest contribution was the huge cave built under the palace, where a dairy was set up to supply milk products to the House of Alba. This basement survived the Civil War and in it Felipe González established his famous bodeguiya (cellar).

For his part, Charles IV did not make many reforms. Still, a mahogany staircase was installed in the entrance hall, and an office was created for his personal use in one of the bedrooms.

In the time of Joseph Bonaparte, the decor was renewed. This task was undertaken by French architect and painter Juan Digourc. Regarding Isidro González Velázquez's restoration, his work was decisive in stopping the deterioration process which was taking place in the palace, and he also made some new buildings, including a House of Trades. The most significant restoration was undertaken between 1918 and 1929 by the Spanish Society of Friends of Art, under the direction of Joaquín Ezquerra del Bayo. The restoration was particularly thorough and sought to recover the appearance that the palace had in the 18th century, as it was to be converted into a museum. The project managed to discover the Greek decoration the Duchess of Arcos had ordered to be made for her bedroom and front bedroom, hidden under different layers of paint.

The gardens of the estate were modified by the painter and gardener Javier Winthuysen Losada in 1922.

== Gallery ==
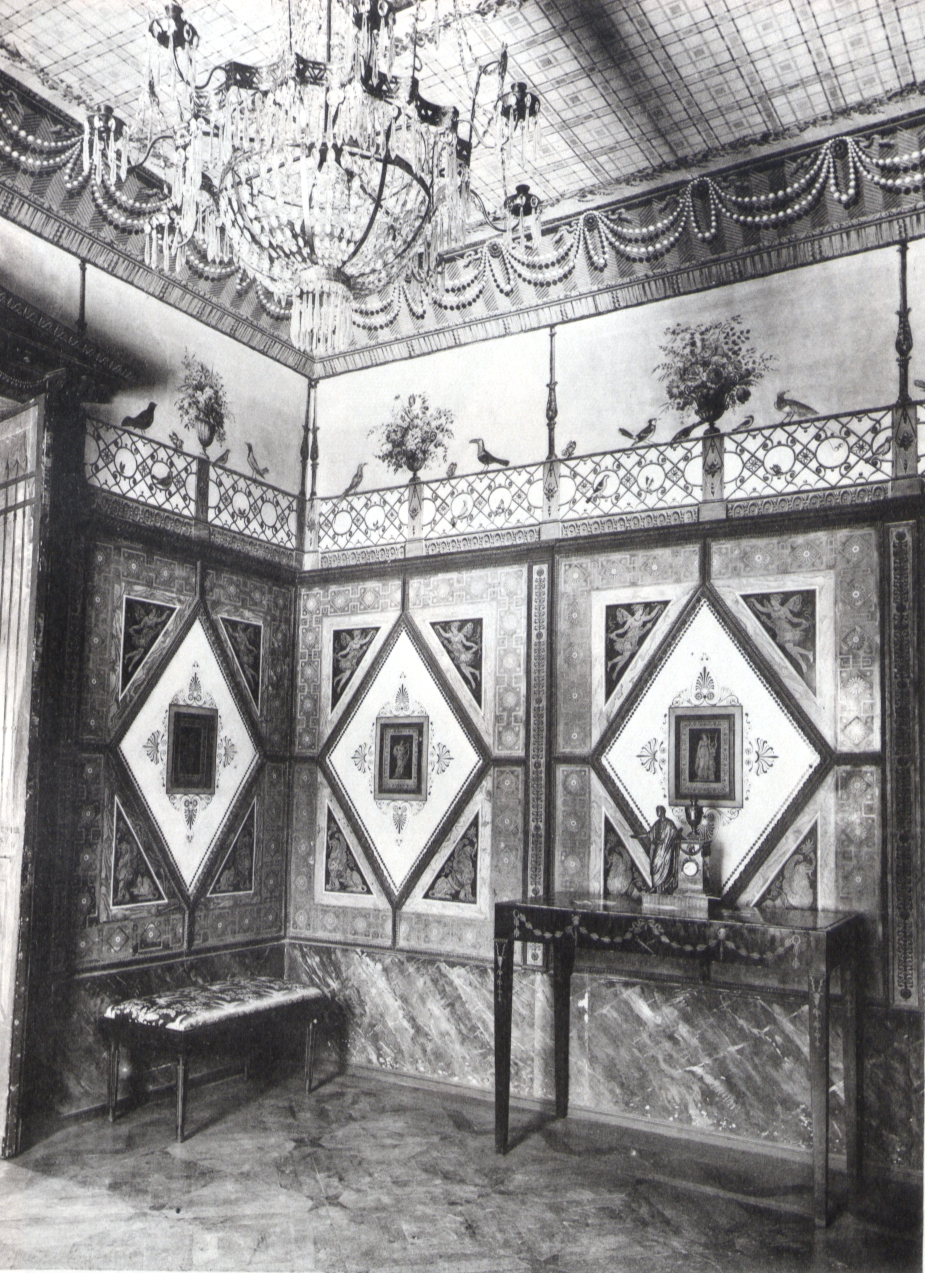
Stucco Cabinet, Palacio de La Moncloa before the Spanish Civil War. (photo taken in 1920).

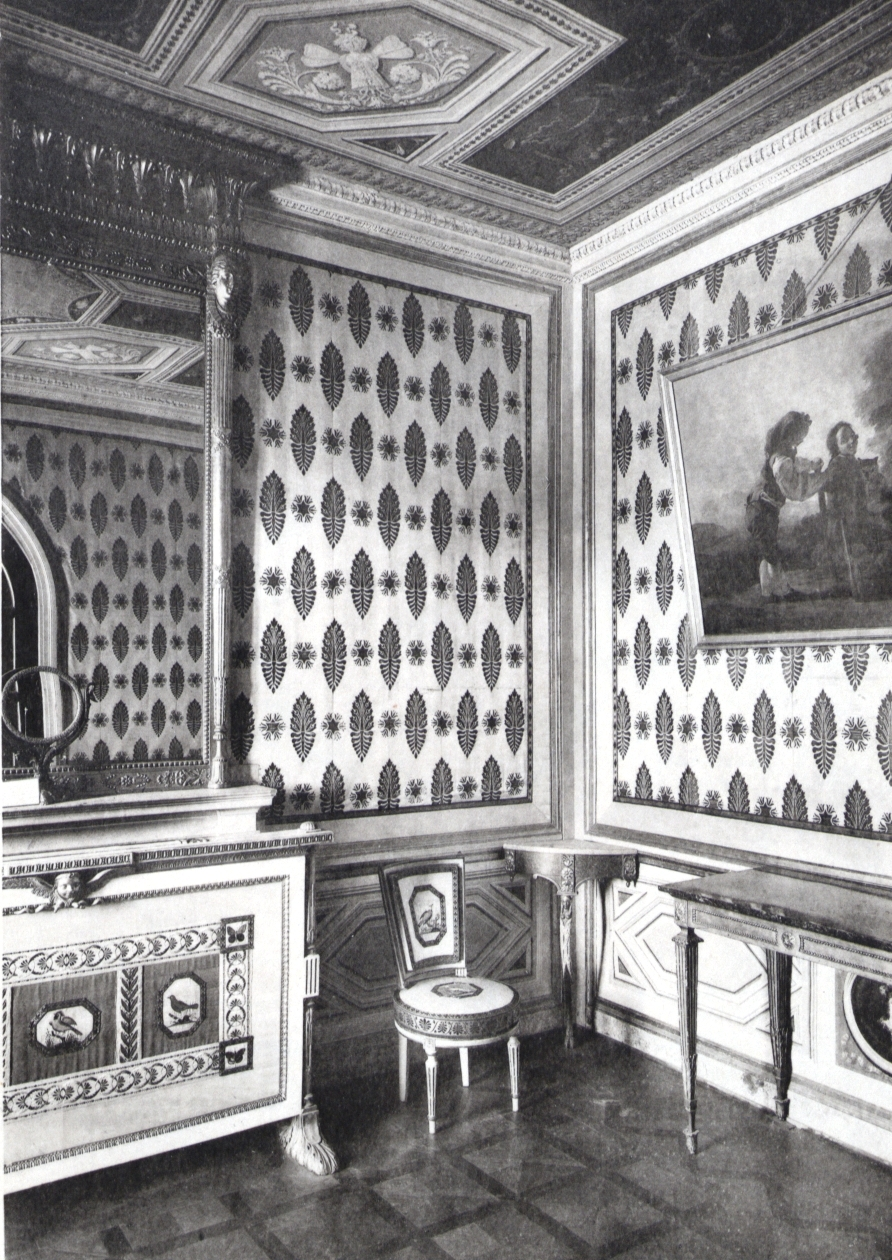
Cabinet of Charles IV, Palacio de La Moncloa before the Civil War (1920)

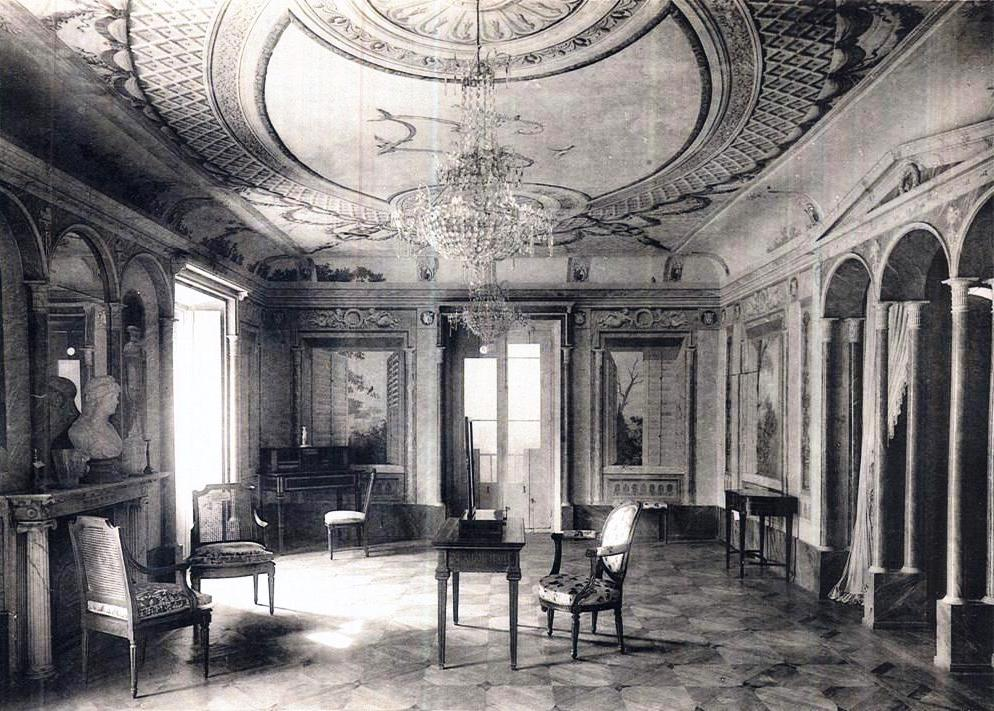
Front bedroom of the Duchess, Palacio de La Moncloa before the Civil War (1920)

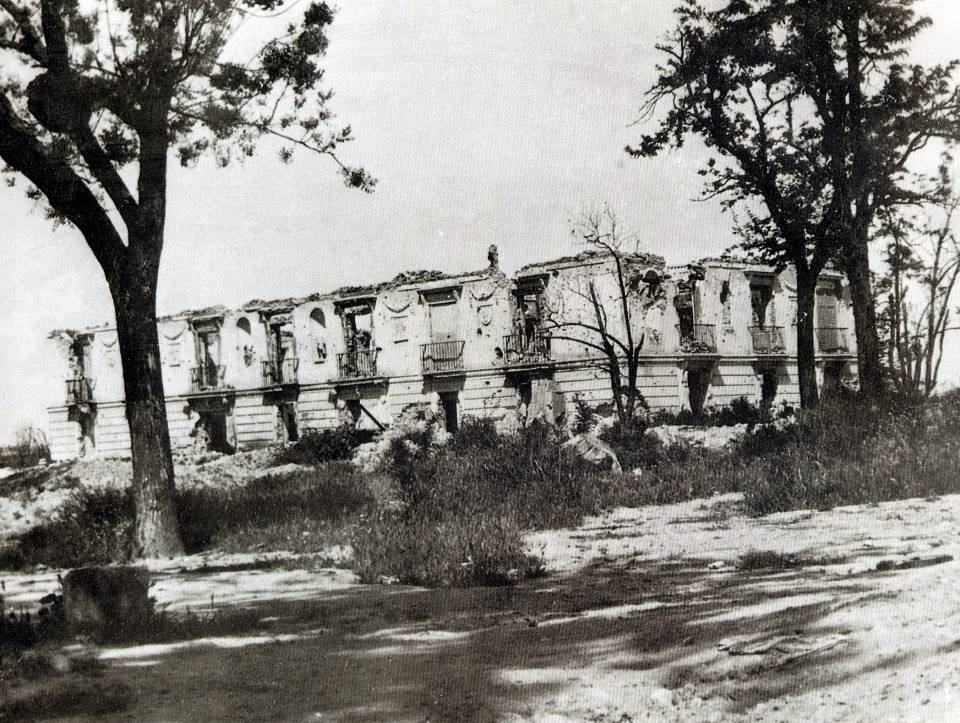
The ruined palace during the Civil War, before being rebuilt into the current palace

== See also ==
- Palace of Moncloa
