= The Tears of Saint Peter (El Greco, Oslo) =

Painting by El Greco

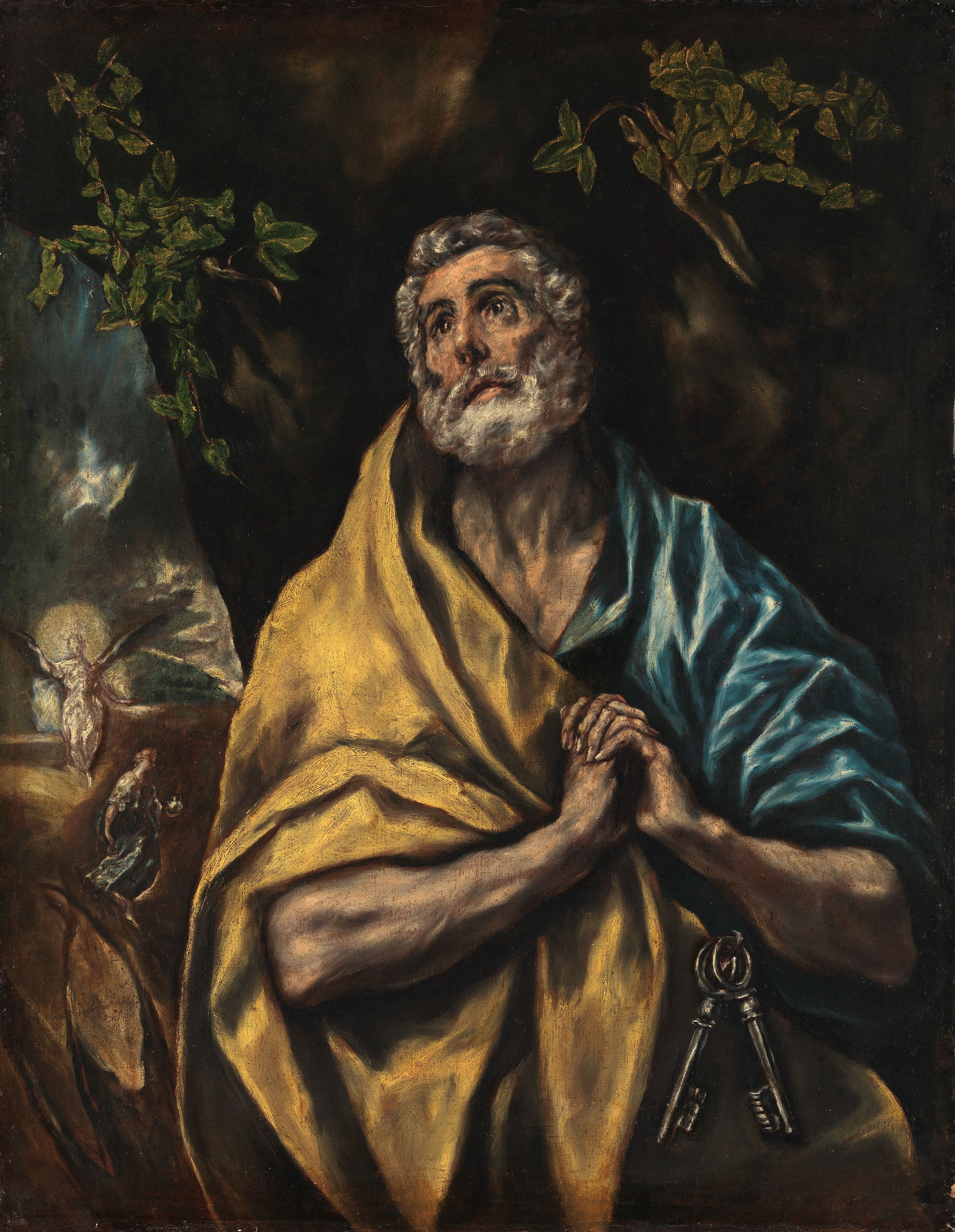
- Artist: El Greco
- Year: c.1590
- Medium: oil on canvas
- Dimensions: 102 cm × 79.5 cm (40 in × 31.3 in)
- Location: National Museum of Art, Architecture and Design, Oslo

The Tears of Saint Peter, Penitent Saint Peter or St. Peter Repentant is a c.1590 painting by El Greco, now in the National Museum of Art, Architecture and Design in Oslo, Norway. Other variants of the work are in the Bowes Museum, the El Greco Museum, Museo Soumaya and others.

Variants of the work are:

- The Tears of Saint Peter (El Greco, Barnard Castle)
- The Tears of Saint Peter (El Greco, Mexico City)
- The Tears of Saint Peter (El Greco and studio, Sitges)
- The Tears of Saint Peter (El Greco and studio, El Greco Museum)
- The Tears of Saint Peter (El Greco, Washington)
- The Tears of Saint Peter (El Greco, Lerma Museum Foundation)
- The Tears of Saint Peter (El Greco, San Diego)

== See also ==
- List of works by El Greco

== Bibliography ==
- ÁLVAREZ LOPERA, José, El Greco, Madrid, Arlanza, 2005, Biblioteca «Descubrir el Arte», (colección «Grandes maestros»).
- SCHOLZ-HÄNSEL, Michael, El Greco, Colonia, Taschen, 2003. ISBN 978-3-8228-3173-1.
