= The Tears of Saint Peter (El Greco, Barnard Castle) =

Painting by El Greco

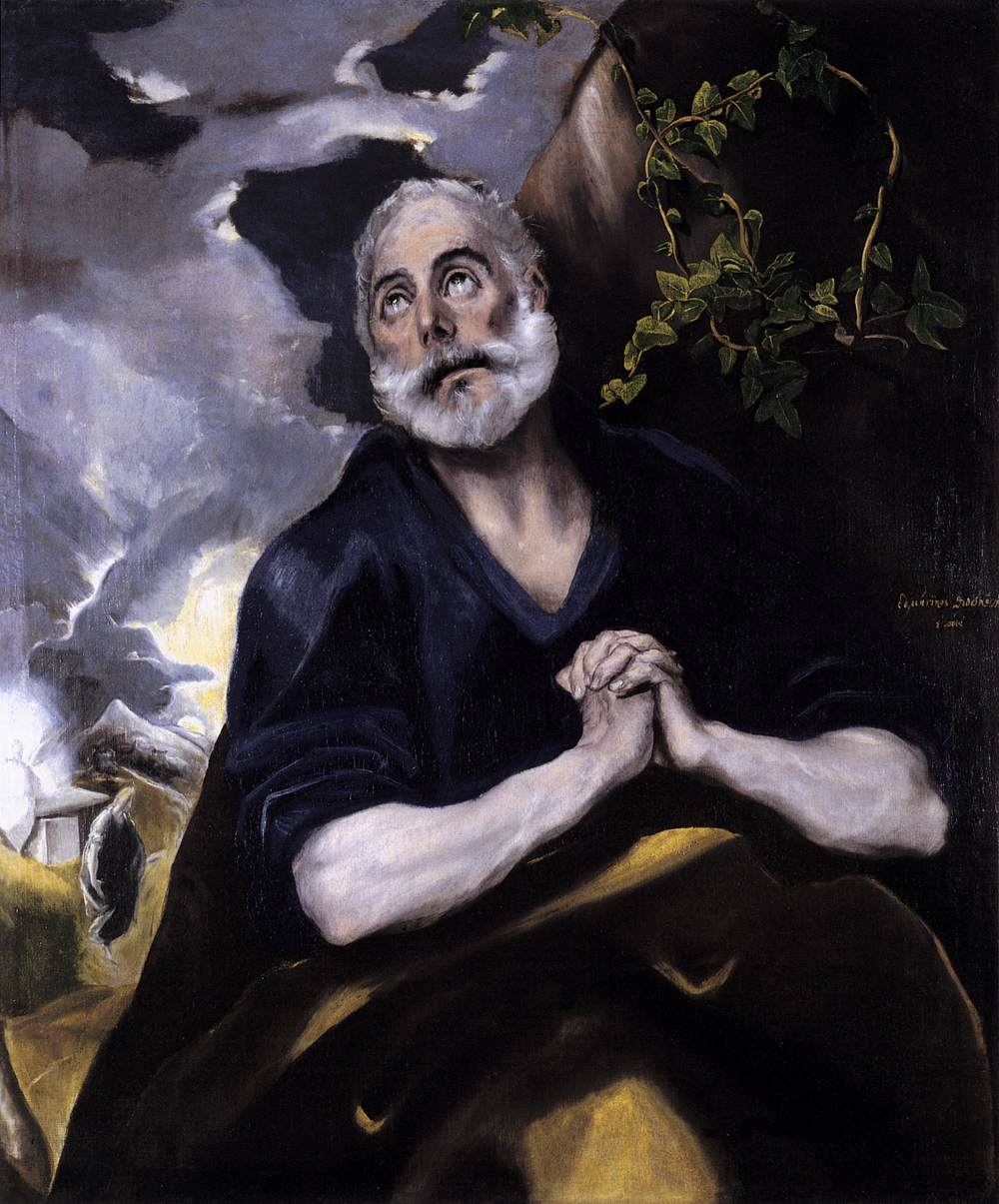
- Artist: El Greco
- Year: 1580-1589
- Medium: oil on canvas

The Tears of Saint Peter or Penitent Saint Peter is a 1580-1589 painting by El Greco, now in the Bowes Museum in Barnard Castle, UK. It shows Peter the Apostle weeping after his betrayal of Jesus.

Variants of the work are in the Museo Soumaya, Oslo, the Museo del Prado, the San Diego Museum of Art and the Toledo Museum of Art.

Variants of the work are:

- The Tears of Saint Peter (El Greco, Oslo)
- The Tears of Saint Peter (El Greco, Mexico City)
- The Tears of Saint Peter (El Greco and studio, Sitges)
- The Tears of Saint Peter (El Greco and studio, El Greco Museum)
- The Tears of Saint Peter (El Greco, Washington)
- The Tears of Saint Peter (El Greco, Lerma Museum Foundation)
- The Tears of Saint Peter (El Greco, San Diego)

== See also ==
- List of works by El Greco

== Bibliography ==
- ÁLVAREZ LOPERA, José, El Greco, Madrid, Arlanza, 2005, Biblioteca «Descubrir el Arte», (colección «Grandes maestros»). ISBN 84-9550-344-1.
- SCHOLZ-HÄNSEL, Michael, El Greco, Colonia, Taschen, 2003. ISBN 978-3-8228-3173-1.
