= August L. Mayer =

German curator, art historian and art collector

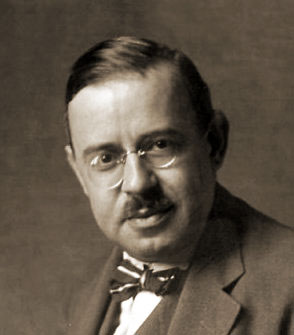
August L. Mayer

August Liebmann Mayer (27 October 1885 in Griesheim – 12 March 1944 in Auschwitz) was a German curator, art historian and art collector specializing in Spanish Golden Age painting. He was fired from his job, his art collection was looted, and he was murdered by Nazis because he was Jewish.

== Biography ==
Mayer was born in Griesheim to the merchant Jonas Mayer and Bertha Mayer geb. Liebmann. Mayer studied archeology and Germanistik (German studies) at the Ludwig-Maximilians-Universität München and the Friedrich Wilhelm University of Berlin, receiving his Ph.D. in 1907. His dissertation on Jusepe Ribera was published as a book. After traveling, Mayer took an unpaid position at the Alte Pinakothek in Munich and eventually started a job as curator in 1914. During WWI, Dr. Mayer served in an infantry unit, returning the art world when it ended.

In 1920, Mayer became Chief Curator at the Bavarian State Paintings Collection (Alte Pinakothek) and as Associate Professor at the Ludwig-Maximilians-Universität München. His expertise in Spanish art was widely recognized.

A disciple of the Swiss Heinrich Wölfflin (1864–1945), an eminent representative of the formalist movement, Mayer was the first to apply a modern methodology to the study of the history of Spanish art. Of Jewish origin, he was murdered in the Auschwitz concentration camp, five days after being deported from Drancy.

== Nazi persecution ==
With the rise of the Nazis, Mayer came under constant attack, notably from Luitpold Dussler (1895–1976), an adjunct professor of art history at the Technische Hochschule München, a Nazi sympathizer and anti-Semite. He was forced to resign all his positions.

On 24 March 1933, Mayer was detained by the Nazis, harassed and tortured, driving him to attempt suicide on 15 June 1933. He was released in July 1933 after a third suicide attempt. As was the case for Jews in Germany, he was subjected to financial fines and confiscatory taxes, his home in Tutzing was confiscated, and he was forced to sell personal property, including works of art.

He fled to France with his family in 1935, financially ruined but able to resume work in art. In 1939, he was arrested and released in France after friends intervened. In February 1944 while hiding in the south of France, Mayer was again arrested, this time in Nice. He was taken to Drancy internment camp where he was interned on 13 February 1944. On 7 March 1944 Mayer was deported on transport nr. 69 to Auschwitz, where he was murdered on 12 March 1944.

The notorious Nazi SS art looter Bruno Lohse was investigated for his role in Mayer's death.

== Art collection: Nazi looting and restitutions ==
Mayer had a substantial art collection which he was forced to sell or which was seized outright by the E.R.R. Nazi looting organisation. Attempts to locate and recover the looted art has been the subject of numerous press articles.

In 2012 the Bavarian National Museum restituted a looted bronze statue to Dr. Mayer's daughter.

In 2014 France decided to restitute a painting the Nazis stole in 1943 to his daughter, Angelika Mayer, who was 84 years old at the time.

in 2015, a 17th century, late Italian Renaissance painting attributed to the workshop of the Late Renaissance Italian painter Giovanni Battista Moroni, entitled "Portrait of a Man" was restituted by the Louvre.

In 2020 an agreement was reached between the Diamond estate and the Mayer heirs concerning Jacopo di Cione's Madonna Nursing the Christ Child with Saints Lawrence and Margaret; Predella: the Man of Sorrows, Mater Dolorosa, and Saint John the Evangelist, with two coats of arms (14th century).

Mayer also owned the 16th-century painting Still Life with Game Fowl by Juan Sánchez Cotán, and is thought to have sold it through the Munich auction house of Hugo Helbing on 24–25 November 1933. The Art Institute of Chicago purchased it from Frederick Mont and Newhouse Galleries in 1955.
