= José Camón Aznar =

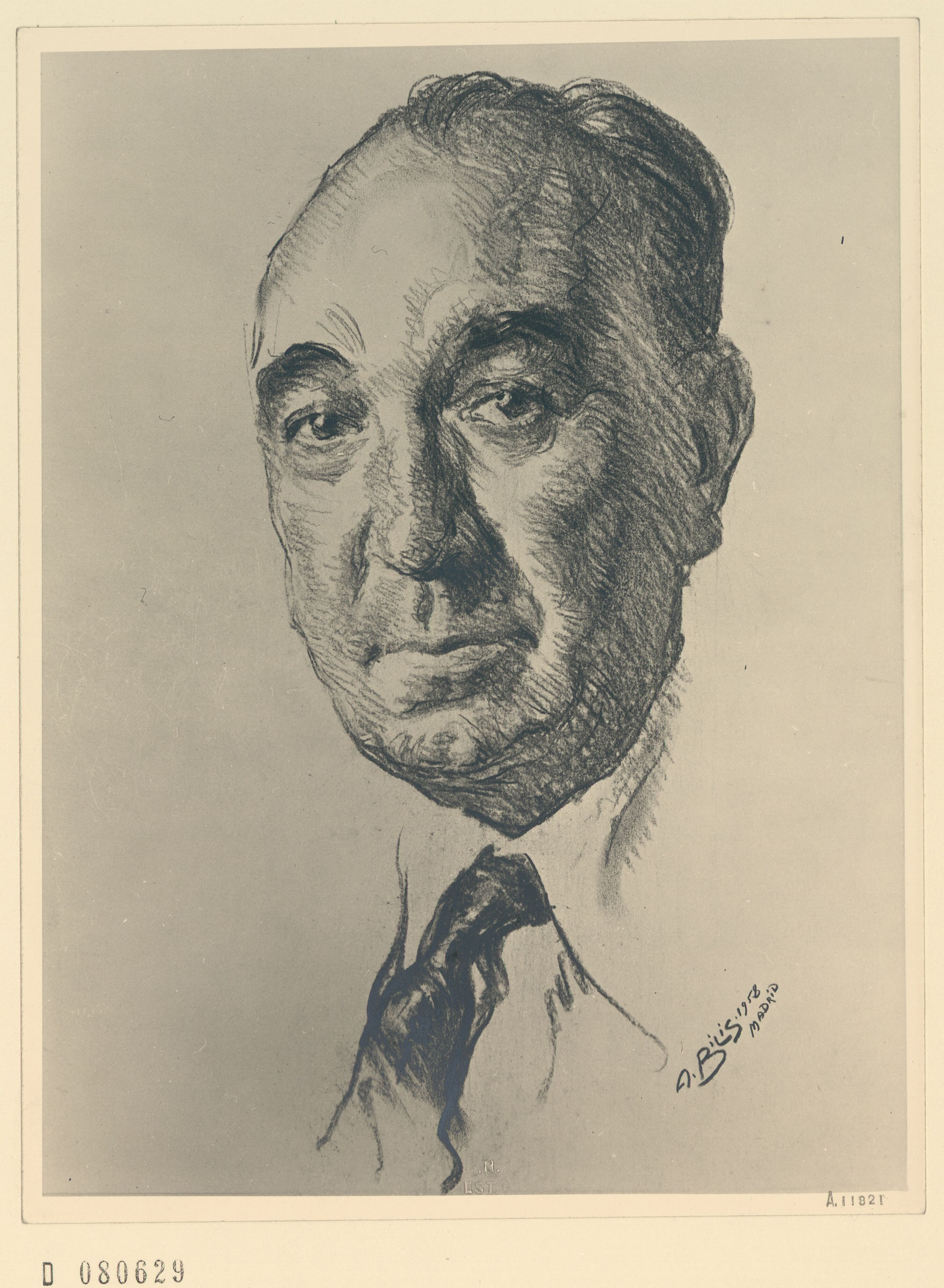
- Born: October 5, 1898; Zaragoza, Spain
- Died: May 15, 1979 (aged 80); Madrid, Spain
- Education: University of Zaragoza
- Occupations: Professor, art historian, author
- Awards: National Literature Prize (1946, 1956)

José Camón Aznar (5 October 1898 - 15 May 1979) was a Spanish professor, art historian, writer and thinker.

== Life ==
He was born in Zaragoza and graduated in law from its university, though this as at his father's insistence and he never practised law. He then gained a doctorate in letters and philosophy and in 1924 (aged only 26) was appointed to the chair in literary theory and arts at the University of Salamanca. During his time in Salamanca he became closely linked with the Radical Republican Party and with Miguel de Unamuno, thus losing his chair at the end of the Spanish Civil War. From 1939 he taught art history at the University of Zaragoza. In 1942 he succeeded in a competitive exam to be appointed to the chair of medieval art history at the Central University, of whose Faculty of Philosophy and Letters he became Dean and later Honorary Dean.

He was a member of the royal academies of Fine Arts of San Fernando, of History and of Moral and Political Sciences. He was also an honorary member of the Royal Academy of Fine Arts of Zaragoza and a corresponding member of the Royal Academy of Fine Arts of Lisbon, the Royal Academy of San Carlos of Valencia, the Royal Academy of San Jorge of Barcelona and several academies in Spanish America. He was director of the Museo Lázaro Galdiano foundation, an advisor to the Consejo Superior de Investigaciones Científicas, president of the Asociación Nacional de Críticos de Arte, a trustee of the Prado Museum the National Archaeological Museum, the Museum of Contemporary Art of Madrid and the Alcázar of Segovia, and "favoured son" of his birthplace.

He edited the Revista de Ideas Estéticas of the Consejo Superior de Investigaciones Científicas and founded Goya, a journal of the Museo Lázaro Galdiano. He wrote widely, including Dios en San Pablo, the novella El pastor Quijótiz and the tragedies Hitler, Lutero, Ariadna, El Cid, personaje mozárabe, El ser en el espíritu and Filosofía del arte. In the fields of art and aesthetics he wrote "El arte desde su esencia", "El escultor Juan de Ancheta", "La arquitectura plateresca" (two volumes), "Domenico Greco", "Picasso y el cubismo", "La arquitectura y la orfebrería en el siglo XVI", "Pintura medieval en España", "Velázquez", "La pintura española en el siglo XVI", "Miguel Ángel", "La pintura española en el siglo XVII", "Juan de Echebarría", "Berruguete", and "Goya". He also wrote countless newspaper articles, exhibition catalogues, forewords to literary, philosophical and artistic works, commentaries and critiques of almost all major contemporary Spanish artists, and book reviews.

His "Influencia de Goya en la pintura universal" won the National Literature Prize in 1946 and his "Picasso y el cubismo" won the National Literature Prize in 1956, whilst his "El Minotauro" won the first national play prize "Seneca" in 1972. He also won the Hispanic Institute for International Research prize. Throughout his life he collected artworks and books. He left his whole collection to the people of Aragón, thus creating Museo e Instituto de Humanidades Camón Aznar. He died in Madrid.

== Bibliography (in Spanish) ==
- Sanz Sanz, María Virginia (1999). Bibliografía de José Camón Aznar. Publicaciones desde 1925 a 1984. Caja de Ahorros y Monte de Piedad de Zaragoza, Aragón y Rioja (Ibercaja, Obra Social y Cultural). ISBN 978-84-8324-046-5.
- Lomba Fuentes, Joaquín (1984). El pensamiento de Camón Aznar. Museo e Instituto de Humanidades 'Camón Aznar'. ISBN 978-84-505-0002-8.

== External links (in Spanish) ==
- José Camón Aznar, in the Gran Enciclopedia Aragonesa OnLine
- Aphorisms by Camón Aznar
- Aphorisms about God by Camón Aznar
