= Harold Wethey =

American art historian (1902–1984)

- Born: Harold Edwin Wethey; April 10, 1902; Port Byron, New York, U.S.
- Died: September 22, 1984 (aged 82); Ann Arbor, Michigan, U.S.
- Occupations: Art historian Educator
- Spouse: Alice
- Children: 1

Academic background
- Education: Cornell University; Harvard University
- Thesis: Gil de Siloé and Sculpture in Burgos under the Catholic Kings (1934)

Academic work
- Discipline: Art history
- Sub-discipline: Spanish art
- Institutions: Bryn Mawr College; Washington University in St. Louis; University of Michigan
- Notable students: Raymond Ward Bissell; Marilyn Stokstad

Harold Edwin Wethey (April 10, 1902 ― September 22, 1984) was an American art historian and educator. From 1940 to 1972, Wethey was a professor of art history at the University of Michigan.

== Career ==
Born in Port Byron, New York, Wethey received a Bachelor of Arts in Romance Languages from Cornell University in 1923, and then a Master of Arts and a Doctor of Philosophy in Art History from Harvard University in 1931 and 1934, respectively. His doctoral dissertation was on the sculptor Gil de Siloé and was titled "Gil de Siloé and Sculpture in Burgos under the Catholic Kings." He taught at Bryn Mawr College and Washington University in St. Louis before joining the art history faculty of the University of Michigan in 1940 until retirement in 1972. There, Wethey also served as department chair. In 1949, he won the inaugural Alice Davis Hitchcock Award from the Society of Architectural Historians.

From 1982 to 1983, Wethey held the post of Samuel Henry Kress Professor at the National Gallery of Art. Wethey died the following year in Ann Arbor, Michigan. Between 2001 and 2005, the National Gallery acquired the papers and photographs of Wethey through his son, David.

Wethey was a scholar on Spanish art and wrote a number of publications on artists such as Alonso Cano and El Greco. His 1962 book titled El Greco and His School in 1962 worked as a catalogue raisonné that greatly reduced the number of works generally accepted to be attributed to the artist. Since then, the discovery of the Dormition of the Virgin by El Greco and other research in the academic world confirmed that the assessments made by Wethey were not entirely correct. Later in life, Wethey also studied the sixteenth-century Italian painter Titian.

== See also ==
- List of Bryn Mawr College people
- List of Cornell University alumni
- List of Harvard University people
