= Saint Peter and Saint Paul =

Saint Peter and Saint Paul may refer to:

- Saint Peter and Saint Paul Archipelago, a group of islets and rocks in the central Atlantic Ocean
- Feast of Saints Peter and Paul, a Christian liturgical feast day observed in June
- Dedication of Saints Peter and Paul, a Roman Catholic liturgical feast day observed in November

== Paintings ==
- Saint Peter and Saint Paul (El Greco, Barcelona)
- Saint Peter and Saint Paul (El Greco, Saint Petersburg)
- Saint Peter and Saint Paul (Ribera)

== See also ==
- St. Peter and St. Paul's Church (disambiguation)
- Saint Peter (disambiguation)
- Saint Paul (disambiguation)
