= Lord's Day =

Sunday in Christianity

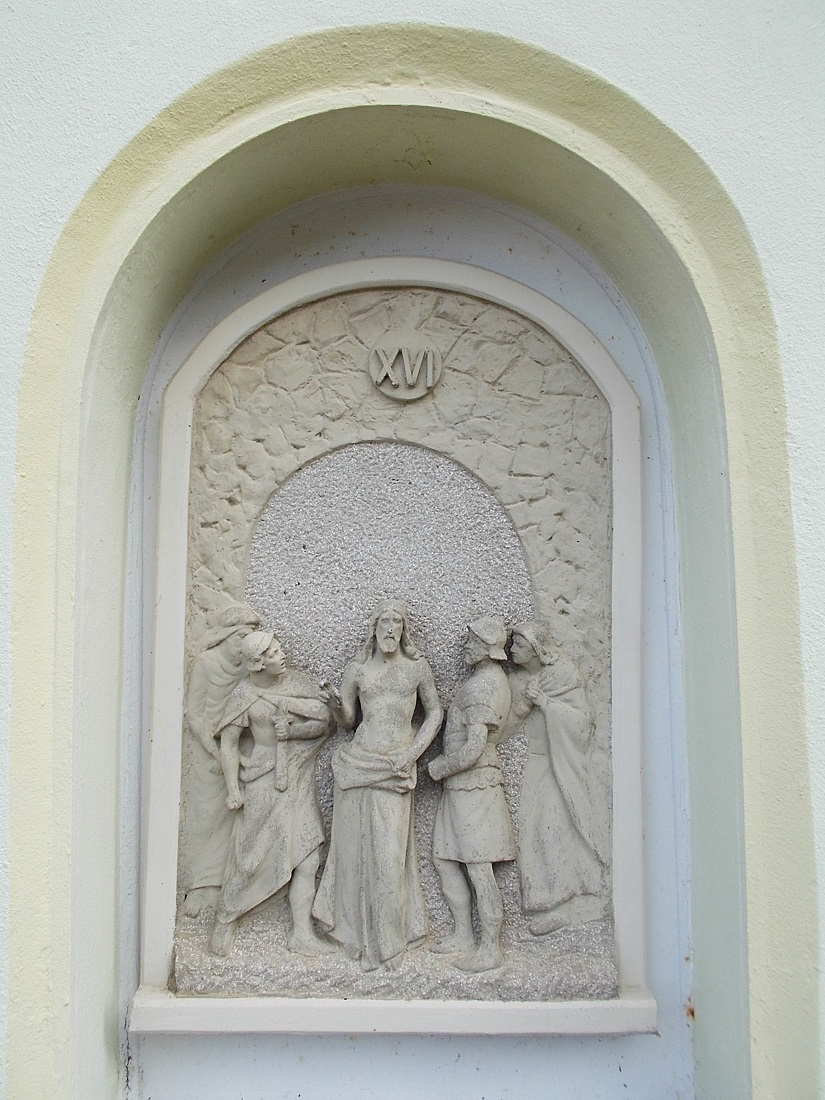
15th Station of the Cross: the Resurrection

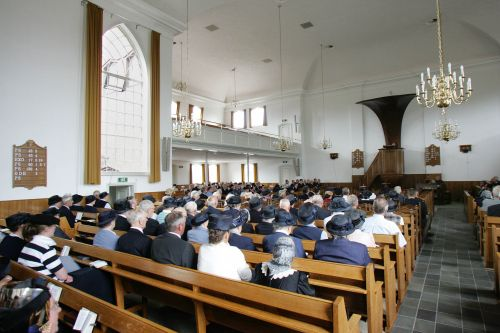
Christian denominations teaching first-day Sabbatarianism, such as the Free Presbyterian Church of Ulster, observe the Lord's Day as a day of worship and rest

In Christianity, the Lord's Day refers to Sunday, the traditional day of communal worship. It is the first day of the week in the Hebrew calendar and traditional Christian calendars. It is observed by most Christians as the weekly memorial of the resurrection of Jesus Christ, who is said to have been raised from the dead early on the first day of the week. The phrase appears only once in Revelation 1:10 of the New Testament.

According to church historian Roger T. Beckwith, Christians held corporate worship on Sunday in the 1st century (First Apology, chapter 67). On 3 March 321, Constantine the Great legislated rest on the pagan holiday Sunday (dies Solis). Before the Early Middle Ages, the Lord's Day became associated with Sabbatarian (rest) practices legislated by Church Councils. Christian denominations such as the Presbyterian, Congregationalist, Baptist, and Methodist traditions regard Sunday as the Christian Sabbath, a practice known as first-day Sabbatarianism (or Sunday Sabbatarianism). Sunday Sabbatarian practices include attending morning and evening church services, receiving catechesis in Sunday School (often referred to as Sabbath school), not doing servile labour, not participating in sporting events that are held on Sundays, not shopping, not eating at restaurants, not using public transportation, as well as not viewing television and using the internet. Christians who are first-day Sabbatarians often engage in works of mercy on the Lord's Day, such as evangelism, visiting prisoners at jails and the sick at hospitals, and nursing homes. A Lord's Day custom present in many Christian countries is the "hearing" (abhören) of children at dinnertime, in which the parents listen their children recall about what was preached in the Sunday Sermon; if any corrections are needed, the parents instruct them.

== Biblical use ==
The phrase "the Lord's Day" appears only one time in the New Testament, in Revelation 1:10 which was written near the end of the first century. It is the English translation of the Koine Greek Kyriake hemera. The adjective kyriake ("Lord's") often elided its noun, as in the neuter kyriakon for "Lord's [assembly]", the predecessor of the word "church"; the noun was to be supplied by context.

The New Testament also uses the phrase te ... mia ton sabbaton (τῇ ... μιᾷ τῶν σαββάτων, "the first day of the week") both for the early morning (Mary Magdalene John 20:1) and evening (the disciples in John 20:19) of Resurrection Sunday, as well as for the breaking of bread at Troas (Acts 20:7) and the day for the collection at Corinth (1 Co 16:2).

== Textual tradition ==
=== Ambiguous references ===
The term "Lord's" appears in The Teaching of the Twelve Apostles or Didache, a document dated between 70 and 120. Didache 14:1a is translated by Roberts as, "But every Lord's day gather yourselves together, and break bread, and give thanksgiving"; another translation begins, "On the Lord's own day". The first clause in Greek, "κατά κυριακήν δέ κυρίου", literally means "On the Lord's of the Lord", a unique and unexplained double possessive, and translators supply the elided noun, e.g., "day" (ἡμέρα hemera), "commandment" (from the immediately prior verse 13:7), or "doctrine". This is one of two early extrabiblical Christian uses of "κυριακήν" where it does not clearly refer to Sunday because textual readings have given rise to questions of proper translation. Breaking of bread may refer to the Eucharist, Christian fellowship (which may be part of the Eucharist), or even agape feasts (cf. Acts 2:42, 20:7). Didache 14 was apparently understood by the writers of the Didascalia and Apostolic Constitutions as a reference to Sunday worship.

Around 110 AD, St. Ignatius of Antioch used "Lord's" in a passage of his letter to the Magnesians. Ambiguity arises due to textual variants. The only extant Greek manuscript of the letter, the Codex Mediceo-Laurentianus, reads, "If, then, those who had walked in ancient practices attained unto newness of hope, no longer observing Sabbath, but living according to the Lord's life ..." (kata kyriaken zoen zontes). A medieval Latin translation indicates an alternate textual reading of kata kyriaken zontes, informing Roberts's translation, "no longer observing the Sabbath, but living in the observance of the Lord's [Day]".

The expanded Pseudo-Ignatian version of Magnesians, from the middle of the third century, rewrites this passage to make "Lord's Day" a clear reference to Sunday, as Resurrection Day. Pseudo-Ignatius adds a repudiation of legalistic Sabbath as a Judaizing error: "Let us therefore no longer keep the Sabbath after the Jewish manner, and rejoice in days of idleness .... But let every one of you keep the Sabbath after a spiritual manner, rejoicing in meditation on the law, not in relaxation of the body, admiring the workmanship of God, and not eating things prepared the day before, nor using lukewarm drinks, and walking within a prescribed space, nor finding delight in dancing and plaudits which have no sense in them. And after the observance of the Sabbath, let every friend of Christ keep the Lord’s Day as a festival, the resurrection-day, the queen and chief of all the days." Other early church fathers similarly saw weekly observance of seventh-day Sabbath sometimes followed the next day by Lord's Day assembly.

=== Undisputed references ===
The first undisputed reference to Lord's Day is in the apocryphal Gospel of Peter (verse 34,35 and 50), probably written about the middle of the 2nd century or perhaps the first half of that century. The Gospel of Peter 35 and 50 use kyriake as the name for the first day of the week, the day of Jesus' resurrection. That the author referred to Lord's Day in an apocryphal gospel purportedly written by St. Peter indicates that the term kyriake was very widespread and had been in use for some time.

Around 170 AD, Dionysius, Bishop of Corinth, wrote to the Roman Church, "Today we have kept the Lord's holy day (kyriake hagia hemera), on which we have read your letter." In the latter half of the 2nd century, the apocryphal Acts of Peter identify Dies Domini (Latin for "Lord's Day") as "the next day after the Sabbath," i.e., Sunday. From the same period of time, the apocryphal Acts of Paul describe St. Paul praying "on the Sabbath as the Lord's Day (kyriake) drew near."

== Early church ==
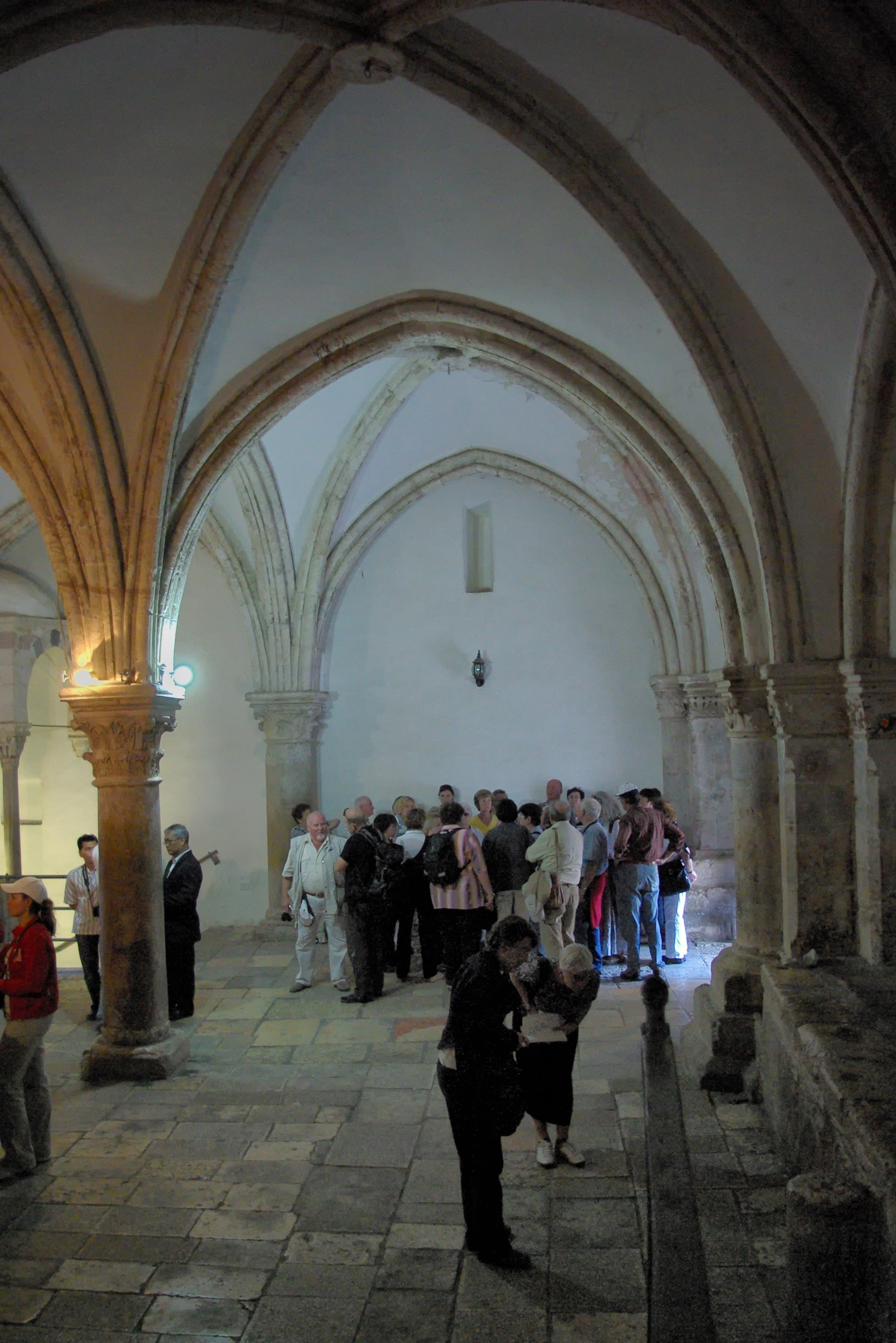
The Cenacle on Mount Zion, claimed to be the location of the Last Supper and Pentecost. Bargil Pixner claims the original Church of the Apostles is located under the current structure.

In the first centuries, Sunday, being made a festival in honor of Christ's resurrection, received attention as a day of religious services. Over time, Sunday thus came to be known as Lord's Day (some patristic writings termed it as "the eighth day"). These early Christians believed that the resurrection and ascension of Christ signals the renewal of creation, making the day on which God accomplished it a day analogous to the first day of creation when God made the light. Some of these writers referred to Sunday as the "eighth day".

The 1st-century or 2nd-century Epistle of Barnabas or Pseudo-Barnabas on Is. 1:13 stated "Sabbaths of the present age" were abolished in favor of one millennial seventh-day Sabbath that ushers in the "eighth day" and commencement of a new world. Accordingly, the eighth-day assembly (Saturday night or Sunday morning) marks both the resurrection and the new creation. Thus first-day observance was a common regional practice at that time.

By the mid-2nd century, Justin Martyr wrote in his apologies about the cessation of Sabbath observance and the celebration of the first (or eighth) day of the week (not as a day of rest, but as a day for gathering to worship): "We all gather on the day of the sun" (τῇ τοῦ ῾Ηλίου λεγομένη ἡμέρᾳ, recalling both the creation of light and the resurrection). He argued that Sabbath was not kept before Moses, and was only instituted as a sign to Israel and a temporary measure because of Israel's sinfulness, no longer needed after Christ came without sin. He also seems to draw a typological link between the Israelite practice of circumcision on the eighth day, and the resurrection of Jesus on the "eighth day." Baptism, having been prefigured by circumcision, represents a participation in the 'new birth' of Christ which takes place at the resurrection.

But the Gentiles, who have believed on Him, and have repented of the sins which they have committed, they shall receive the inheritance along with the patriarchs and the prophets, and the just men who are descended from Jacob, even although they neither keep the Sabbath, nor are circumcised, nor observe the feasts.

And on the day called Sunday, all who live in cities or in the country gather together to one place, and the memoirs of the apostles or the writings of the prophets are read, as long as time permits; then, when the reader has ceased, the president verbally instructs, and exhorts to the imitation of these good things. Then we all rise together and pray, and, as we before said, when our prayer is ended, bread and wine and water are brought, and the president in like manner offers prayers and thanksgivings, according to his ability, and the people assent, saying Amen; and there is a distribution to each, and a participation of that over which thanks have been given, and to those who are absent a portion is sent by the deacons. And they who are well to do, and willing, give what each thinks fit; and what is collected is deposited with the president, who succours the orphans and widows and those who, through sickness or any other cause, are in want, and those who are in bonds and the strangers sojourning among us, and in a word takes care of all who are in need. But Sunday is the day on which we all hold our common assembly, because it is the first day on which God, having wrought a change in the darkness and matter, made the world; and Jesus Christ our Saviour on the same day rose from the dead.

Tertullian (early 3rd century), writing against Christians who participated in pagan festivals (Saturnalia and New-year), defended the Christian festivity of Lord's Day amidst the accusation of sun-worship, acknowledging that "to [us] Sabbaths are strange" and unobserved.

Cyprian, a 3rd-century church father, linked the "eighth day" with the term "Lord's Day" in a letter concerning baptism.

'For in respect of the observance of the eighth day of the Jewish circumcision of the flesh, a sacrament was given beforehand in shadow and in usage; but when Christ came, it was fulfilled in truth. For because the eighth day, that is, the first day after the Sabbath, was to be that on which the Lord should rise again, and should quicken us, and give us circumcision of the spirit, the eighth day, that is the first day after the Sabbath, and the Lord's Day, went before in the figure; which figure ceased when by and by the truth came and spiritual circumcision was given to us.

— Cyprian, Letter LVIII

=== Origins of worship on Sundays ===
Though Christians widely observed Sunday as a day of worship by the 2nd century, the origin of Sunday worship remains a debated point. Scholars promote at least three positions:

- Bauckham has argued that Sunday worship must have originated in Judea in the mid-1st century, in the period of the Acts of the Apostles, no later than the Gentile mission; he regards the practice as universal by the early 2nd century with no hint of controversy (unlike. for example, the related Quartodeciman controversy). In the 2nd century the church of Rome lacked jurisdictional authority to impose a novel universal change of Sabbath rest from the seventh day to the first, or to obtain universal Sunday worship had it been introduced after the Christian church had spread throughout the known world. Bauckham states that there is no record of any early Christian group which did not observe Sunday, with the exception of a single extreme group of Ebionites mentioned by Eusebius of Caesarea; and that there is no evidence that Sunday was observed as substitute Sabbath worship in the early centuries. However Acts 13:14, 42, 44, 15:21, 16:13, 17:2, and 18:4 indicate that the Apostles were still worshiping on Sabbath.
- Some Protestant scholars have argued that Christian Sunday worship traces back even further, to the resurrection appearances of Jesus recorded in the Gospel narratives where Jesus would appear to his disciples on the first day of the week.
- Seventh-day Adventist scholar Samuele Bacchiocchi has argued that Sunday worship, unconnected to the Sabbath, was introduced by Constantine the Great in Rome in 321, and was later enforced by him throughout the Christian church as a substitution for Sabbath worship.

=== Edict of Constantine ===
On 3 March 321, Constantine I decreed that Sunday (dies Solis) will be observed as the Roman day of rest [CJ3.12.2]:

On the venerable day of the Sun let the magistrates and people residing in cities rest, and let all workshops be closed. In the country however persons engaged in agriculture may freely and lawfully continue their pursuits because it often happens that another day is not suitable for grain-sowing or vine planting; lest by neglecting the proper moment for such operations the bounty of heaven should be lost.

== Middle Ages ==
Augustine of Hippo followed the early patristic writers in spiritualizing the meaning of the Sabbath commandment, referring it to eschatological rest rather than observance of a literal day. However, the practice of Sunday rest increased in prominence throughout the early Middle Ages. Thomas Aquinas taught that the decalogue is an expression of natural law which binds all men, and therefore the Sabbath commandment is a moral requirement along with the other nine. Thus Sunday rest and Sabbath became increasingly associated.

Following Aquinas' decree, Christian Europeans could now spend less time denouncing the Judaistic method of observing the Sabbath, instead establishing rules for what one "should" and "should not" do on the Sabbath. For example, while the Medieval Church forbade most forms of work on the Sabbath, it allowed "necessary works", and priests would allow their peasants to perform the needed agricultural work in the field.

== Teaching by denomination ==
Though Sunday Sabbatarian practice declined in the 18th century, the evangelical awakening in the 19th century led to a greater concern for strict Sunday Sabbatarian observance. The founding of the Lord's Day Observance Society in 1831 was influenced by the teaching of bishop Daniel Wilson.

=== Reformed ===
The Heidelberg Catechism of the Reformed Churches founded by John Calvin, teaches that the moral law as contained in the Ten Commandments is binding for Christians and that it instructs Christians how to live in service to God in gratitude for His grace shown in redeeming mankind. The doctrine of the Christian Reformed Church in North America thus stipulates "that Sunday must be so consecrated to worship that on that day we rest from all work except that which charity and necessity require and that we refrain from recreation that interferes with worship."

Sunday Sabbatarianism became prevalent amongst both the continental and English Protestants over the following century. A new rigorism was brought into the observance of Lord's Day among the 17th-century Puritans of England and Scotland, in reaction to the laxity with which Sunday observance was customarily kept. Sabbath ordinances were appealed to, with the idea that only the word of God can bind men's consciences in whether or how they will take a break from work, or to impose an obligation to meet at a particular time. Their influential reasoning spread to other denominations also, and it is primarily through their influence that "Sabbath" has become the colloquial equivalent of "Lord's Day" or "Sunday". The most mature expression of this influence survives in the Reformed Westminster Confession of Faith (1646), Chapter 21, "Of Religious Worship, and the Sabbath Day". Section 7-8 reads:

7. As it is the law of nature, that, in general, a due proportion of time be set apart for the worship of God; so, in his Word, by a positive, moral, and perpetual commandment binding all men in all ages, he hath particularly appointed one day in seven, for a Sabbath, to be kept holy unto him: which, from the beginning of the world to the resurrection of Christ, was the last day of the week; and, from the resurrection of Christ, was changed into the first day of the week, which, in Scripture, is called the Lord’s day, and is to be continued to the end of the world, as the Christian Sabbath.

8. This Sabbath is then kept holy unto the Lord, when men, after a due preparing of their hearts, and ordering of their common affairs beforehand, do not only observe a holy rest, all the day, from their own works, words, and thoughts about their worldly employments and recreations, but also are taken up, the whole time, in the public and private exercises of his worship, and in the duties of necessity and mercy.

=== Anabaptism ===
Anabaptists hold that the Lord's Day should be commemorated through the attendance of church services, along with works of mercy such as "witnessing for God in one of many ways, visiting someone who is sick or discouraged, widows, orphans, or older people, spending time with the family, studying some subject of interest in the Bible that some are wondering about, reading upbuilding literature, etc." In the view of Anabaptist Christianity, "worldly entertainment that would draw our minds away from Christ would be a poor way to commemorate His resurrection". The Statement of Faith and Practice of Salem Amish Mennonite Church, a Conservative Mennonite congregation in the Beachy Amish Mennonite tradition, is reflective of traditional Anabaptist teaching on the Lord's Day:

The Lord's Day shall be observed in a godly way, with no unnecessary buying, selling or other Sunday burdens. Our children need to be taught to respect the Lord's Day. God's people must gather with the brethren in the spirit of reverence and worship before God. It is expected that all members are regularly present and participate in the services.

Likewise, the Church Polity of the Dunkard Brethren Church, a Conservative Anabaptist denomination in the Schwarzenau Brethren tradition, teaches that "The First Day of the week is the Christian Sabbath and is to be kept as a day of rest and worship. (Matt. 28:1; Acts 20:7; John 20:1; Mark 16:2)"

=== Lutheranism ===
Martin Luther, in his work against the Antinomians who he saw as heretical, Luther rejected the idea of the abolition of the Ten Commandments. The Lutheran divines viewed Sunday rest as a civic institution, which provided an occasion for bodily rest and public worship. Laestadian Lutherans teach that the Lord's Day should be devoted to God and that engaging in recreational activities on Sundays is sinful. The Large Catechism holds the Lord's Day to be reserved for the public worship of God, including the preaching of the Gospel:

...since from of old Sunday [the Lord’s Day] has been appointed for this purpose, we also should continue the same, in order that everything be done in harmonious order, and no one create disorder by unnecessary innovation. Therefore this is the simple meaning of the commandment: since holidays are observed anyhow, such observance should be devoted to hearing God’s Word, so that the special function of this day should be the ministry of the Word for the young and the mass of poor people; yet that the resting be not so strictly interpreted as to forbid any other incidental work that cannot be avoided.

Lutheranism places an emphasis on the celebration of the Eucharist on the Lord's Day:

“Why should the living Christ give this gift for His gathered guests each Lord’s Day?” To unite bodily with His Bride with all the authority in heaven and earth. The living Christ, here and now, in the flesh, does this. He continues the teaching and doing that He did in His earthly ministry (Luke 24:50–53; Acts 1:1–11). He does not teach and act today in some spiritualized, “wispy” manner. Rather, “Jesus Christ has come in the flesh” (1 John 4:2), and continues to teach and act in physical, “fleshy” ways. How wondrous! Jesus, the God-man, still ministers in the flesh for us. The third stanza of Luther’s Commandment hymn reinforces this truth about Sabbath Day worship. Concerning the day of rest, he writes, “and put aside the work you do, So that God may work in you” (LSB 581:4). Luther’s words apply to the preaching Christ does for His gathered church (Rom. 10:17; Luke 10:16). Surely, they also apply to Christ serving His church His holy food. The question “Why should the living Christ come to serve us this wondrous and forgiving gift?” is answered by Luther’s Sabbath Day hymn, “so that God may work in you.”

=== Roman Catholicism ===
The 1917 Code of Canon Law ¶1248 stipulated that "On feast days of precept, Mass is to be heard; there is an abstinence from servile work, legal acts, and likewise, unless there is a special indult or legitimate customs provide otherwise, from public trade, shopping, and other public buying and selling." Examples of servile works forbidden under this injunction include "plowing, sowing, harvesting, sewing, cobbling, tailoring, printing, masonry works" and "all works in mines and factories"; commercial activity, such as "marketing, fairs, buying and selling, public auctions, shopping in stores" is prohibited as well.

The Second Vatican Council, in the Apostolic Constitution Sacrosanctum Concilium, asserted that "the Lord's day is the original feast day" and the "foundation and kernel of the whole liturgical year." The apostolic letter of Pope John Paul II entitled Dies Domini charged Catholics to remember the importance of keeping Sunday holy and not to confuse the holiness of the Lord's Day celebration with the common notion of the weekend as a time of simple rest and relaxation. The Catholic Church teaches that "The Day of the Lord, after the public worship, should be spent in works of piety and charity, in peaceful relaxation, in the happy union of family life."

=== Eastern Orthodoxy ===
The Eastern Orthodox Church distinguishes between the Sabbath (Saturday), and the Lord's Day (Sunday). It is common practice for parishes and monasteries to celebrate the Divine Liturgy on both Saturday and Sunday mornings. The church prohibits strict fasting, which is defined as abstention from oil and wine, on any Saturday (except for Holy Saturday) or Sunday. Consequently, the fasting rules on Saturdays and Sundays that fall during a fasting season, such as Great Lent or the Apostles' Fast, are relaxed to permit the use of oil and wine.

During Great Lent, the full Divine Liturgy is not celebrated on weekdays; instead, the Liturgy of the Presanctified Gifts is served on certain days. The full Liturgy continues to be celebrated on Saturdays and Sundays. The church also prescribes a cycle of Bible readings (Epistle and Gospel) for Saturdays and Sundays that is distinct from the sequential readings appointed for weekdays.

As the weekly celebration of the Resurrection, the Lord's Day receives greater liturgical emphasis than the Sabbath. For instance, the prescribed service for Saturday evening in the Russian Orthodox tradition is the All-Night Vigil, a service that combines Vespers and Matins. In all Orthodox traditions, the Sunday service is augmented with special Resurrectional hymns chanted only on that day. If a lesser feast day falls on a Sunday, its hymns are combined with the standard Resurrectional hymns, though a Great Feast of the Lord supersedes the usual Sunday service. Furthermore, some hymns from the preceding Sunday are repeated on the following Saturday, marking a liturgical connection between the weeks.

=== Oriental Orthodoxy ===
In part, the reason Orthodox Christians continue to celebrate Saturday as Sabbath is because of its role in the history of salvation: it was on a Saturday that Jesus "rested" in the tomb after his work on the cross. For this reason also, Saturday is a day for general commemoration of the departed, and special requiem hymns are often chanted on this day.

The Ethiopian Orthodox church (part of the Oriental Orthodox communion, having about 40 million members) observes both Saturday and Sunday as holy, but places extra emphasis on Sunday.

=== Quakerism ===
The Richmond Declaration, a confession of faith held by the Orthodox branch of the Religious Society of Friends (Quakerism), teaches with regard to the First Day of the Week:

Whilst the remembrance of our Creator ought to be at all times present with the Christian, we would express our thankfulness to our Heavenly Father that He has been pleased to honor the setting apart of one day in seven for the purposes of holy rest, religious duties, and public worship; and we desire that all under our name may avail themselves of this great privilege as those who are called to be risen with Christ, and to seek those things that are above where He sitteth at the right hand of God. (Col 3:1) May the release thus granted from other occupations be diligently improved. On this day of the week especially ought the households of Friends to be assembled for the reading of the Scriptures and for waiting upon the Lord; and we trust that, in a Christianly wise economy of our time and strength, the engagements of the day may be so ordered as not to frustrate the gracious provision thus made for us by our Heavenly Father, or to shut out the opportunity either for public worship or for private retirement and devotional reading.

=== United Brethren ===
The Church of the United Brethren in Christ, in its membership standards codified in the Book of Discipline, teaches in its position on the Lord’s Day Observance:

1. Following the example of the early disciples and New Testament church, everyone should make provision for exercises of devotion on Sunday, the Lord’s Day, and inasmuch as possible shall attend all services for hearing read the Word of God, singing spiritual songs and hymns, Christian fellowship, and giving of tithes and offerings (John 20:19, 1 Corinthians 16:2, Hebrews 10:25). 2. Members are admonished to neither buy nor sell needlessly on the Lord’s Day.

These standards expect the faithful to honour the Lord's Day by attending the morning service of worship and the evening service of worship on the Lord's Day, in addition to not engaging in Sunday trading.

=== Methodism ===
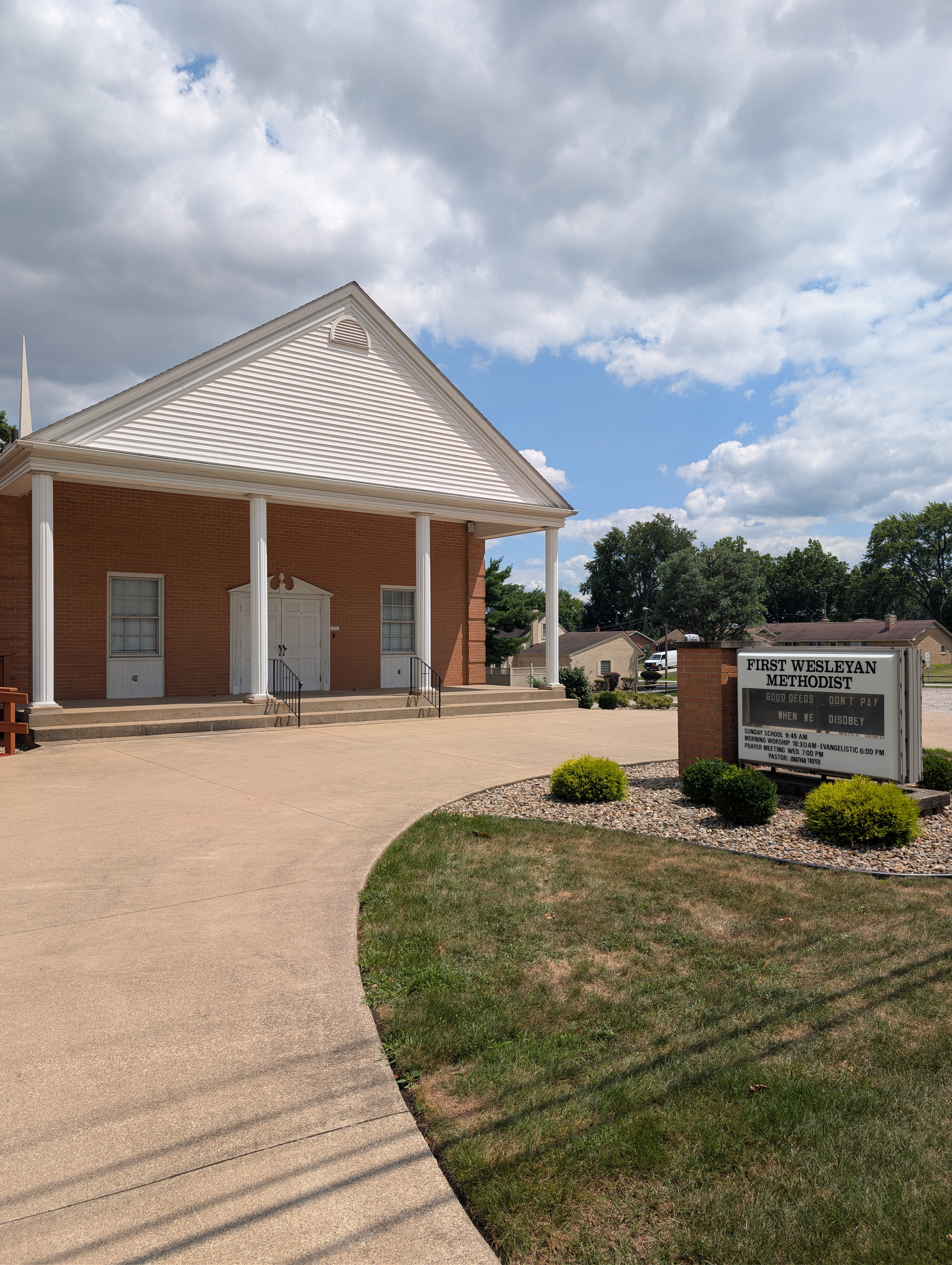
The sign of this Wesleyan Methodist church displays the times for the Sunday morning service of worship and Sunday evening service of worship, consistent with the historical First-day Sabbatarian doctrine of Methodism to keep the Lord's Day holy. The midweek Wednesday prayer service (a common Methodist observance) is indicated on the sign as well.

The General Rules of the Methodist Church requires "attending upon all the ordinances of God" including "the public worship of God". Methodist churches have historically observed the Lord's Day devoutly with a morning service of worship, along with an evening service of worship. The founder of Methodism, John Wesley, stated "This 'handwriting of ordinances' our Lord did blot out, take away, and nail to His cross (Col. 2:14). But the moral law contained in the Ten Commandments, and enforced by the prophets, He did not take away .... The moral law stands on an entirely different foundation from the ceremonial or ritual law .... Every part of this law must remain in force upon all mankind and in all ages." This is reflected in the doctrine of Methodist denominations, such as the Allegheny Wesleyan Methodist Connection, which in its 2014 Discipline teaches that the Lord's Day "be observed by cessation from all unnecessary labor, and that the day be devoted to divine worship and rest." In explicating the Fourth Commandment, a prominent Methodist catechism states:

To keep holy means that no unnecessary work or travel be done on this day. It is a day of rest and worship, a day of Bible reading and prayer. We must not buy, sell, or bargain on Sunday, which is the Lord's day.

The Book of Discipline of the Evangelical Methodist Church Conference reflects this, teaching:

40. The Lord's Day is a fundamental institution of God. Our people are to remember it as a day of worship, rest and service. In so doing, they will avoid the pitfalls inherent in holiday diversions, secular activities such as unnecessary buying, selling and labor, and activities designed solely for personal pleasure without reference to their spiritual profit.
41. We believe Christ made allowances for acts of mercy on the Lord's Day such as; nurses, doctors, etc. Matthew 12:11; John 5:15-16

=== Holiness Pentecostalism ===
Churches in the Holiness Pentecostal tradition hold to the historic Methodist views on the Lord's Day; Holiness Pentecostal churches have a morning service of worship and an evening service of worship on the Lord's Day. To this end, Holiness Pentecostal churches "oppose the increasing commercialization and secularization of Sunday." The Book of Discipline of the Fire-Baptized Holiness Church, a Holiness Pentecostal denomination, states:

Every member of the Fire-Baptized Holiness Association of America shall be required to observe the Lord's Day according to the teachings of Jesus Christ and the holy apostles, and to abstain from doing their own pleasure thereon.

== See also ==
- Church attendance
- Lord's Day Observance Society
- Sabbath in Christianity
- Saint Kyriake
- Shabbat
- Friday prayer
