= Dedication of the Lateran Basilica =

Feast day in the Catholic Church

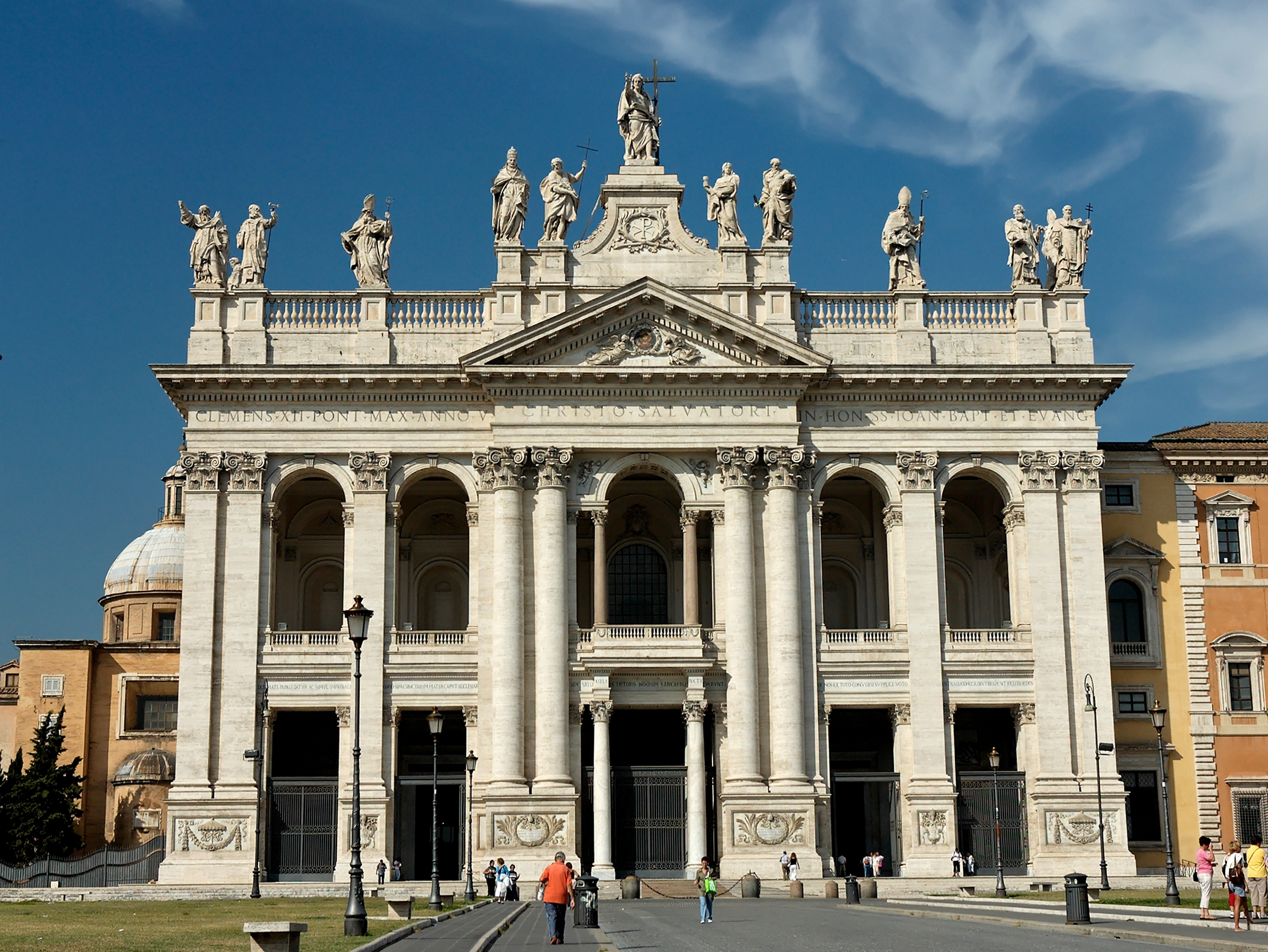
Saint John Lateran

The Dedication of the Lateran Basilica is a feast day in the Catholic Church on 9 November.

It commemorates the dedication and consecration of the Archbasilica of Saint John Lateran by Sylvester I in Rome in 324. Sylvester presided over the official dedication of the archbasilica and the adjacent Lateran Palace, changing the name from Domus Fausta to Domus Dei ("House of God"), with a dedication to Christ the Savior (Christo Salvatori).

The anniversary of the dedication of the church has been observed as a feast since the 12th century. In the General Roman Calendar of the Catholic Church, 9 November is the feast of the Dedication of the (Arch)Basilica of the Lateran (Dedicatio Basilicae Lateranensis), referred to in older texts as the "Dedication of the Basilica of the Most Holy Savior". It is one of the Feasts of Jesus Christ as the basilica is dedicated to the Most Holy Saviour.

The Readings of the day are about the Temple in Jerusalem with the Gospel Reading being about Jesus Cleansing the Temple.

== See also ==
- Dedication of Saint Mary Major
- Dedication of Saint Peter and Paul
