= Secular clergy =

Deacons and priests who are not members of religious orders

In Christianity, the term secular clergy refers to deacons and priests who are not monastics or otherwise members of religious life. Secular priests (sometimes known as diocesan priests) are priests who commit themselves to a certain geographical area and are ordained into the service of the residents of a diocese or equivalent church administrative region. That includes serving the everyday needs of the people in parishes, but their activities are not limited to that of their parish.

== Etymology and terminology ==
The Latin word saeculum referred to a period of time roughly equivalent to 100 years. It forms the basis of the word for century in Romance languages (e.g., French siècle, or Italian secolo). Latin Christianity adopted the term in Ecclesiastical Latin to refer to matters of an earthly and temporal, as opposed to a heavenly and eternal, nature. In the 12th century, the term came to apply to priests obligated with parochial and ministerial duties rather than the "regular" duties of monastic clergy who were bound to the rule of a religious order, often called "religious clergy".

While the term "diocesan priest" is often used to describe secular priests, not all secular priests are diocesan. In the Latin Church, other territorial and non-territorial ecclesial jurisdictions such as the personal prelature of Opus Dei, military and personal ordinariates, and apostolic vicariates all include secular clergy. In the Catholic Church, Anglicanism, and other contexts, the term "secular priest" does not delineate between celibate and non-celibate priests.

== Catholic Church ==
Latin Church canon law makes specific demands on clergy, whether regular or secular, quite apart from the obligations consequent to religious vows. Thus in the Latin Church, among other regulations, clerics other than permanent deacons "are obliged to observe perfect and perpetual continence for the sake of the kingdom of heaven and therefore are bound to celibacy" and to carry out the canonical hours, typically according to the Liturgy of the Hours, daily. They are forbidden to "assume public offices which entail a participation in the exercise of civil power." All clerics, once ordained, are forbidden from marrying or remarrying.

The teachings of the Catholic Church and some scholars hold that a tradition of clerical continence existed in early Christianity, whereby married men who became priests were expected to abstain from sexual relations with their wives. The Council of Elvira, held before Emperor Constantine the Great legalized Christianity, made it an explicit law that bishops and other clergy should not have sexual relations with their wives. Despite consistently upholding the doctrine of clerical celibacy, over the following centuries the Church experienced many difficulties in enforcing it, particularly in rural areas of Europe. Finally, in the 12th century the Western Church declared that Holy Orders were not merely a prohibitive but a diriment canonical impediment to marriage, making marriage by priests invalid and not merely forbidden.

The secular clergy, in which the hierarchy essentially resides, takes precedence over the regular clergy of equal rank. The episcopal office was the primary source of authority in the Church, and the secular clergy arose to assist the bishop. Only bishops can ordain Catholic clergy.

Within the pre-Reformation Catholic Church, secular clergy saw several series of reforms. During the Gregorian Reforms of the 11th century, behaviors considered worldly – such as clerical marriage and simony (the purchase of ecclesiastical positions) – were prohibited. Similar reforms followed in 12th century from the Third Lateran Council and the 13th century from the Fourth Lateran Council.

One root of the 1896 Philippine Revolution was the agitation of native secular priests for parish assignments. Priests of powerful religious orders were given preferential treatment in these assignments and were usually Spaniards who trained in European chapters. The agitation led to the execution of the "Gomburza filibusteros", under charges of involvement in the 1872 Cavite Mutiny.

St. Thomas Becket is a patron saint of secular clergy. St. John Vianney is patron saint of parish priests. St. Stephen is patron saint of deacons.

=== Preparation ===
Preparation for Catholic priesthood generally requires eight years of study beyond high school, usually including a college degree followed by four or more years of theology study at a seminary.

At the time of their ordination as deacons (usually about a year before their ordination as priests) they promise respect and obedience to the diocesan bishop and his successors. They also promise to live in chastity, and according to the status of clergy (which includes a comparatively simple life). Diocesan priests do make vows, and must remain celibate and adhere to Canon law, but they do not promise poverty, so they may own their own property, such as cars, and handle their own financial affairs.

=== Liturgical responsibilities ===
In his apostolic letter Dies Domini, Pope John Paul II wrote: "Among the many activities of a parish, none is as vital or as community-forming as the Sunday celebration of the Lord's Day and his Eucharist".

A diocesan priest spends much of his time preparing for and celebrating the Sacraments (Eucharist, Reconciliation, Baptism, Marriage, Anointing of the Sick, Confirmation). In the Dogmatic Constitution Lumen gentium, the Second Vatican Council teaches that the priest acting in persona Christi celebrates the Sacrifice of the Mass and administers the Sacraments. "Christ is also present through preaching and the guidance of the faithful, tasks to which the priest is personally called."

There are many parishioners whom he visits, those who are ill, those who are dying, and those who are unable to travel outside their homes. Sometimes, he is directly involved in the catechetical work of the parish and teaches catechism classes. He works with parish and finance councils that assist him in overseeing the welfare of the parish. Diocesan priests may serve in myriad different capacities, these services include, but are not limited to, campus ministry, teaching, and chaplain work for hospitals or prisons.

== Eastern Orthodox Church ==
In the Eastern Orthodox Church, the term "secular clergy" refers to married priests and deacons, as opposed to monastic clergy (hieromonks and hierodeacons). The secular clergy are sometimes referred to as "white clergy", black being the customary colour worn by monks.

Traditionally, parish priests are expected to be secular clergy rather than monastics, as the support of a wife is considered necessary for a priest living "in the world". Since there are no orders like Catholic ones, all clergy in Eastern Orthodoxy, secular and monastic, are diocesan.

== See also ==
- Catholic religious order
- List of Catholic religious institutes
- Religious institute (Catholic)
- Secular institute
- Vocational discernment in the Catholic Church
- Secularization movement in the Philippines
