= Feasts of Jesus Christ =

Specific days in the liturgical calendar

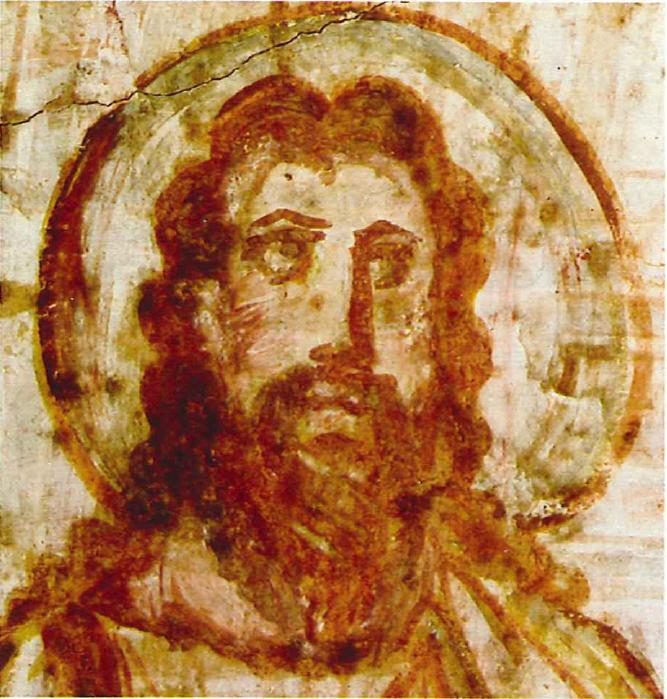
Jesus. Mural painting from the catacomb

Feasts of Jesus Christ are specific days of the year distinguished in the liturgical calendar as being significant days for the celebration of events in the life of Jesus Christ and his veneration, for the commemoration of his relics, signs and miracles. While Easter is treated everywhere as the central religious feast in the Christian liturgical year, the other feasts differ in the liturgical practice.

== In the Catholic Church ==
Since the Second Vatican Council, the Catholic liturgical calendar distinguishes four ranks of celebrations: solemnities, feasts, memorials, and optional memorials. Most of the celebrations of events in the life of Christ are ranked as solemnities. However, there are a few celebrations related to titles or mysteries of Christ which are ranked as feasts, and these are known collectively as "Feasts of the Lord." In the current General Calendar from the Third Edition of the Roman Missal, these are:

- The Holy Family of Jesus, Mary and Joseph, celebrated on the Sunday between December 25 and January 1, or if there is no Sunday in that range (when December 25 and January 1 fall on Sundays), on December 30.
- The Baptism of the Lord, celebrated on the Sunday after January 6 (or, where the Solemnity of the Epiphany is transferred to the Sunday that occurs on January 7 or 8, on the following Monday)
- The Presentation of the Lord, celebrated on 2 February
- The Transfiguration of the Lord, celebrated on 6 August
- The Exaltation of the Holy Cross, celebrated on 14 September
- The Dedication of the Lateran Basilica, celebrated on 9 November (this is a feast of the Lord because the basilica is dedicated to him under the title of the Most Holy Saviour).

In the pre-Vatican II usage, the term feast denoted any celebration, not just a specific rank. Hence, also celebrations which are today termed solemnities of the Lord (e.g. Christmas, Easter, Pentecost, Christ the King) were once deemed Feasts of the Lord.

== In the Orthodox Church ==
Three main categories of feasts, distinguished in the Orthodox liturgical practice, namely

- Feasts of the Lord Jesus Christ (Господские праздники, or Владычные праздники)
- Feasts of the Theotokos (Богородичные праздники; by definition same to Marian feast days, the actual set differs between Catholic and Orthodox Churches)
- Feasts of Saints

While Easter is treated as Feast of Feasts, the following eight feasts of Christ are assigned the highest rank of the Great Feasts in the Eastern Orthodox and Greek-Catholic liturgical calendars:

- Feast of the Cross — 14 (27) September
- Christmas — 25 December (7 January)
- Baptism of Jesus — 6 (19) January
- Presentation of Jesus at the Temple — 2 (15) February
- The Raising of Lazarus (Lazarus Saturday) — Saturday before Palm Sunday
- Palm Sunday — (Moveable feast)
- Ascension of Jesus — (Moveable feast)
- Pentecost — (Moveable feast)
- Transfiguration of Jesus — 6 (19) August

Though some sources place the Presentation of Jesus at the Temple among the Great Feasts of Christ, including the above list, these sources are likely incorrect. This feast is most accurately described as a combined Great Feast of the Lord and Great Feast of the Mother of God. As such, liturgically, it does not have the same place of honor as the other seven purely Great Feasts of the Lord, which includes, among other things, the complete suppression of all Resurrectional elements from the Octoechos/Parakalitiki in all services related to a typical Sunday when one of the pure Great Feasts of the Lord happens to fall on a Sunday (e.g. Feast of the Cross, Christmas, Baptism of Jesus, and Transfiguration of Jesus) and those that already only occur on Sunday (e.g. Palm Sunday and Pentecost). On the contrary, when the Presentation of Jesus at the Temple falls on a Sunday, the typical Resurrectional Sunday elements from the Octoechos/Paraklitiki are not suppressed; instead, they are combined with the Menaion elements of the feast, as clearly discussed in the Typikon (the rubric rule book). Furthermore, as is the case with other Great Feasts of the Mother of God, when the Presentation of Jesus falls on a typical Wednesday or Friday fast day, fasting is not completely suppressed, but merely lessened, in contrast to other pure Great Feasts of the Lord that do not fall within a general fasting period, where fasting would be completely suppressed (with the obvious exception of the Exaltation of the Cross, which always requires fasting). Of course, further evidence of its combined status as a Feast of the Lord and Feast of the Mother of God can be found in the antiphonal verses chosen for the Divine Liturgy and the fact that its communion hymn for the Divine Liturgy is the most common one used for Feasts of the Mother of God. As such, liturgically and from a fasting perspective (two key elements that define all Orthodox feasts), the feast of the Presentation of Jesus at the Temple should be placed with the other four Great Feasts of the Mother of God as opposed to the Great Feasts of the Lord.

=== Lesser Feasts ===
- The Circumcision of our Lord and Savior Jesus Christ (celebrated together with Saint Basil the Great) — 1 January
- Uncovering of the Precious Cross and the Precious Nails (Roodmas) by Empress Saint Helena in Jerusalem — 6 March
- Commemoration of the Apparition of the Sign of the Precious Cross Over Jerusalem, in 351 AD — 7 May
- Veneration of the Cross — third Sunday of Great Lent
- Antipascha: Saint Thomas Sunday — Second Sunday of Easter
- Mid-Pentecost — the 25th day of Easter (the midpoint between the Easter and Pentecost)
- Whit Monday — (Moveable feast)
- Commemoration of the Apparition of the Holyrood at Godenovo — 29 May
- The Placing of the Honorable Robe of the Lord at Moscow — 10 July
- Forefeast of the Procession of the Honorable and Lifegiving Cross of the Lord — 31 July
- Procession of the Honorable Wood of the Life-Giving Cross of the Lord — 1 August
- All-Merciful Saviour — 1 August
- Translation of the Image "Not-Made-By-Hands" of our Lord Jesus Christ from Edessa to Constantinople (Afterfeast of the Dormition of the Mother of God) — 16 August
- Church New Year (Indiction) — 1 September
- Forefeast of the Elevation of the Cross, Commemoration of the Founding of the Church of the Resurrection (Holy Sepulchre) at Jerusalem — 13 September
- The Universal Exaltation of the Precious and Life-Giving Cross — 14 September
- Translation from Malta to Gatchina a Particle of the Life Giving Cross — 12 October

=== Civil commemorations ===
- Commemoration of the Great Earthquake at Constantinople (740) — 26 October
- Battle of Poltava — 27 June
- Treaty of Nystad — 30 August

== Literature ==
- Настольная книга священнослужителя (Nastol'naya Kniga Sviashchenno-sluzhitelia), Volume 4, Moscow, 1983. Translated in «The Messenger» of St. Andrew's Russian Orthodox Cathedral. Philadelphia, June, July–August, September, 1990.

== See also ==
- General Roman Calendar of 1954
- General Roman Calendar of Pope Pius XII
- General Roman Calendar of 1960
- Tridentine calendar
