= Saint Peter and Saint Paul (El Greco, Saint Petersburg) =

Painting by El Greco

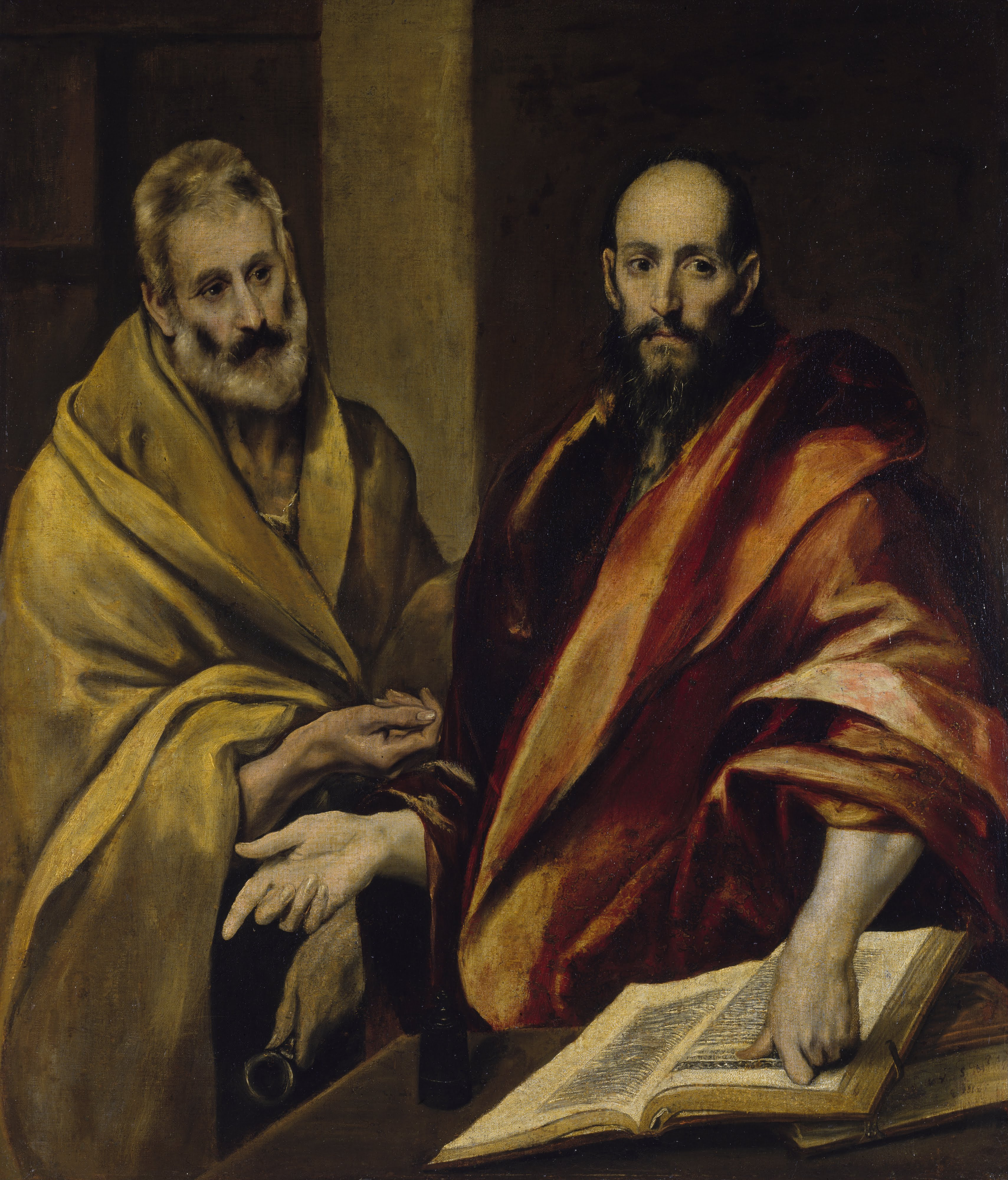
- Artist: El Greco
- Year: 1587-1592
- Medium: oil on canvas
- Dimensions: 121.5 cm × 105 cm (47.8 in × 41 in)
- Location: Hermitage, Saint Petersburg

Saint Peter and Saint Paul is a 1587-1592 painting by El Greco, one of several versions of the theme by the artist - others are now in Barcelona and Stockholm. It shows the apostles Saint Peter and Saint Paul. The work was once shown on a stamp produced by the USSR.

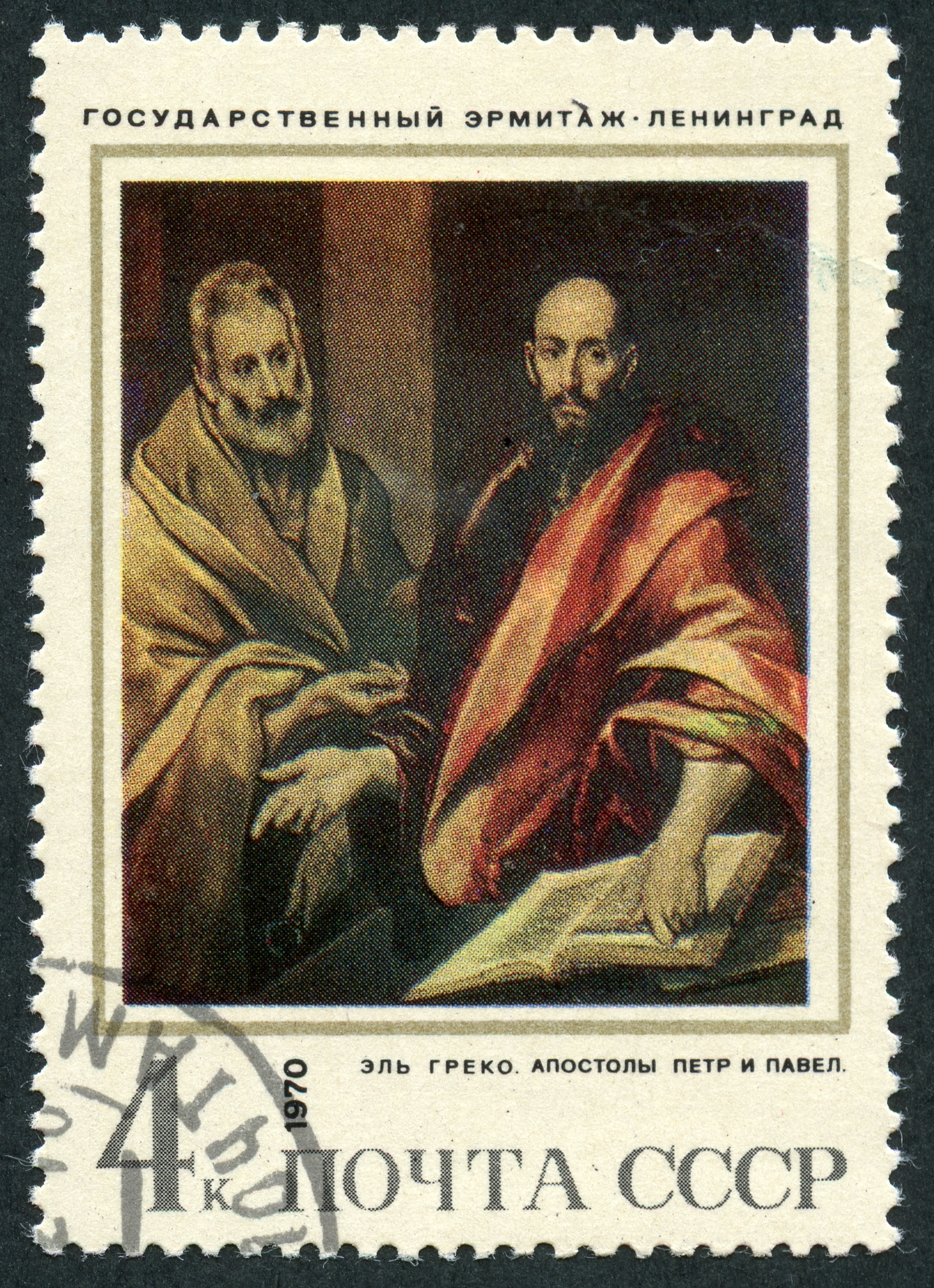
Saint Peter and Saint Paul on a Soviet postage stamp, 1970

== See also ==
- List of works by El Greco

== Bibliography ==
- (in Spanish) ÁLVAREZ LOPERA, José, El Greco, Madrid, Arlanza, 2005, Biblioteca «Descubrir el Arte», (colección «Grandes maestros»). ISBN 84-9550-344-1.
- (in Spanish) SCHOLZ-HÄNSEL, Michael, El Greco, Colonia, Taschen, 2003. ISBN 978-3-8228-3173-1.
