= Saint Peter and Saint Paul (El Greco, Barcelona) =

Painting by El Greco

- San Pedro y San Pablo (Spanish)
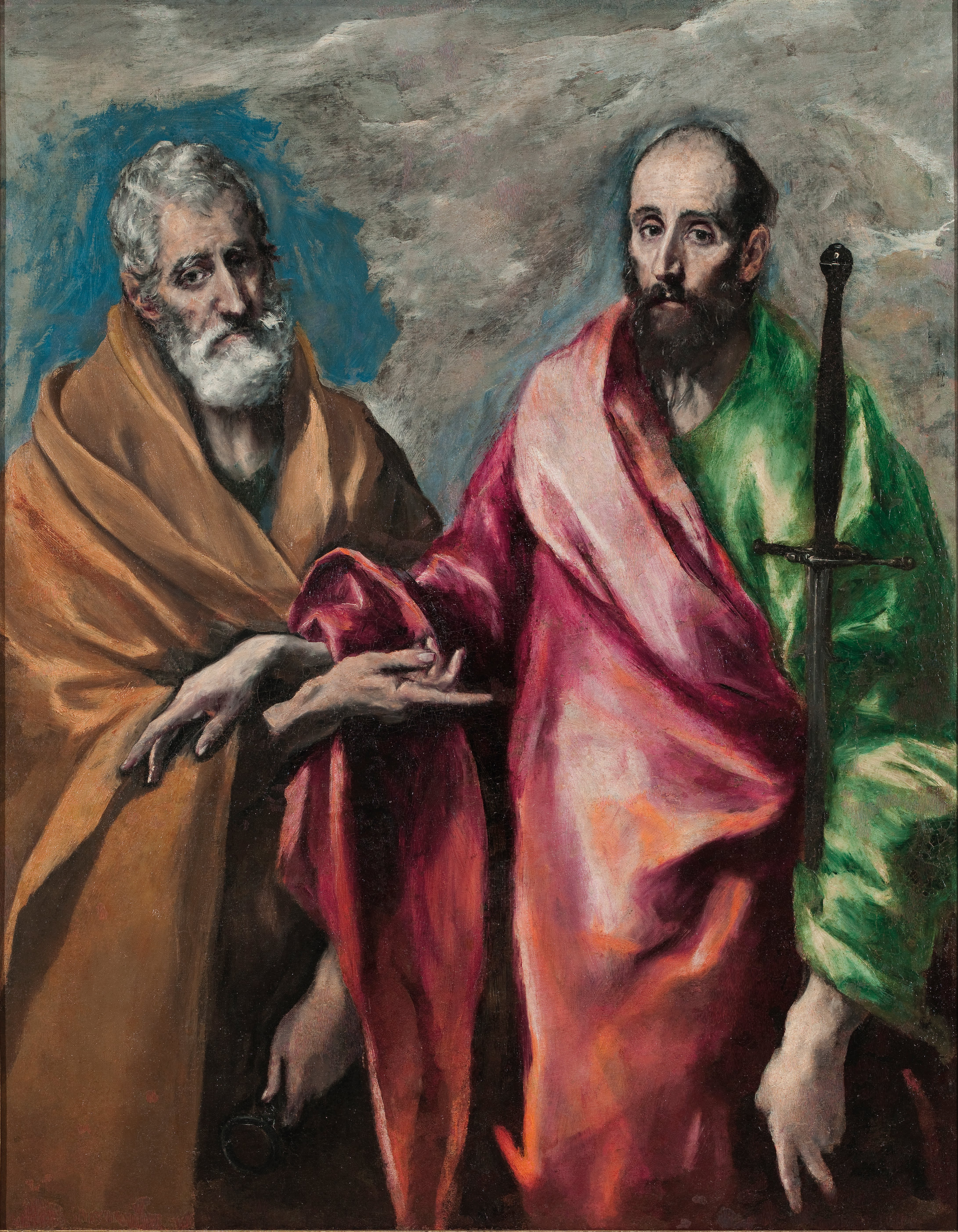
- Artist: El Greco
- Year: 1590-1600
- Medium: Oil on canvas
- Dimensions: 116 cm × 91.8 cm (46 in × 36.1 in)
- Location: Museu Nacional d'Art de Catalunya; Barcelona

Saint Peter and Saint Paul is a painting by the Cretan-Spanish artist El Greco. The work was completed between 1590 and 1600. It is currently on display at the Museu Nacional d'Art de Catalunya, who purchased the work in 1932.

== Description ==
El Greco completed Saint Peter and Saint Paul between 1590 and 1600, while living in Toledo, Spain. Returning to a theme he had previously painted in a work now in the Hermitage, the painting depicts saints Peter and Paul, two of the Apostles of Jesus. According to the guide of the Museu Nacional d’Art de Catalunya, the painting is “enriched by modern use of colour, the fruit of the lessons the artist had learned in Venice.” El Greco created a sense of a halo around the heads of the saints by providing an intense blue opening in the background clouds. The placement of the hands of the saint, crossed without actually touching, symbolizes a possible disagreement between the two. The older Peter, on left, is gesturing towards Paul, suggesting a sign of surrender in the disagreement.

== El Greco ==
Doménikos Theotokópoulos was born around 1541 in what is modern day Heraklion, Crete. The nickname El Greco is Italian and means “The Greek”, reflecting his citizenship and the time he spent in Italy. In the 1560s, El Greco moved to Venice, where he studied painting under Titian and learned the techniques of Renaissance painting. El Greco moved in 1577 to Toledo, Spain, where he completed many of the masterpieces attributed to him. El Greco died in Toledo in April 1614. Today, El Greco is seen as a major influence for Cubism and Expressionism, as well as artists such as Picasso and Cézanne.

== Subject ==
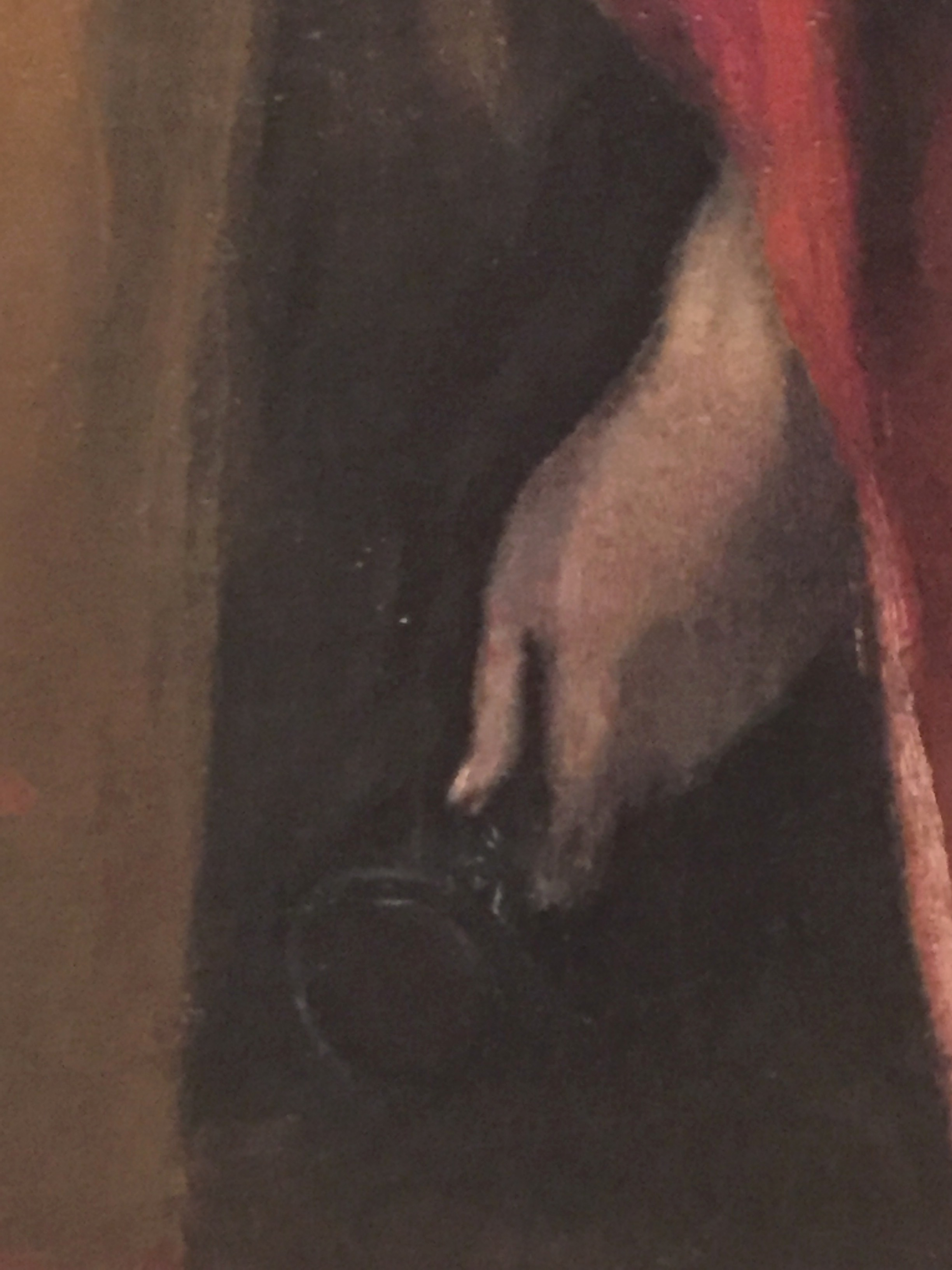
Detail of Saint Peter and Saint Paul, by El Greco, showing the hand of Peter holding the keys of heaven.

=== Saint Peter ===
The figure on the left in El Greco's Saint Peter and Saint Paul can be identified as Saint Peter. In the Bible, Peter is one of the first disciples that Jesus calls upon. In the Book of Matthew, Jesus said to Peter, “And I tell you that you are Peter, and on this rock I will build my church, and the gates of Hades will not overcome it. I will give you the keys of the kingdom of heaven; whatever you bind on earth will be bound in heaven, and whatever you loose on earth will be loosed in heaven." El Greco included the keys of heaven in this painting, as seen in the left hand of Peter.

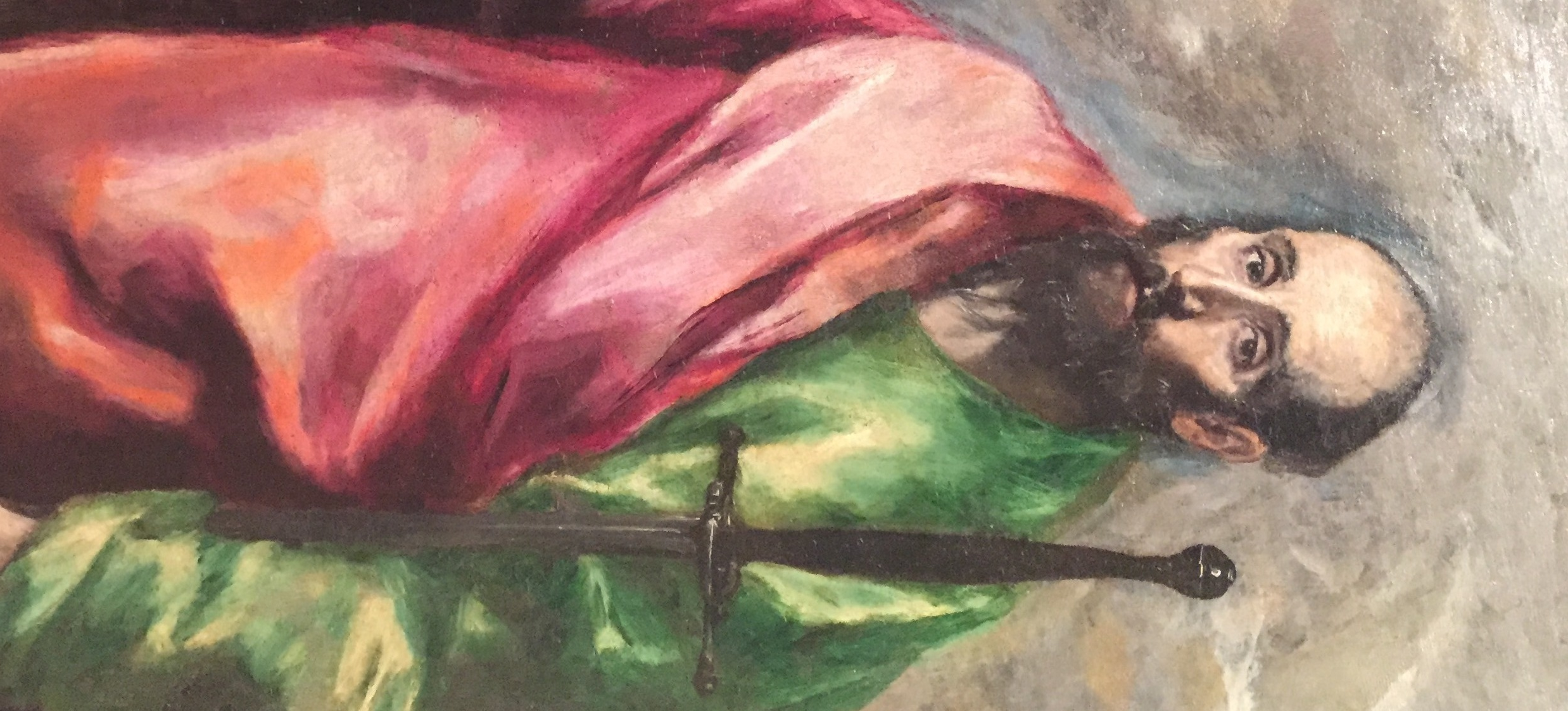
Detail of Saint Peter and Saint Paul, by El Greco, showing Paul holding his sword, a symbol of his death.

=== Saint Paul ===
On the right of the painting is Saint Paul. Paul was one of the major contributors to the Bible, as well the founder of many Christian churches. Paul was born Jewish and lived under these beliefs until he was visited, on the street, by the resurrected Jesus, causing his conversion to Christianity. In El Greco's painting, Paul is depicted holding a sword, a symbol of his martyrdom for his Christian beliefs.

== Museu Nacional d'Art de Catalunya ==
The Museu Nacional d’Art de Catalunya purchased El Greco's Saint Paul and Saint Paul in 1932. The painting was part of a large collection the museum purchased from Lluis Plandiura, a Catalan politician. The art collection of Plandiura was one of the most important in Spain at the time and contain almost 2000 works, including paintings, sculpture, and archaeological pieces.

== See also ==
- List of works by El Greco
