= Dedication of Saints Peter and Paul =

Catholic feast day, 18 November

The Dedication of the Basilicas of the Apostles Peter and Paul is a feast day on the liturgical calendar of the Catholic Church, which is celebrated on 18 November.

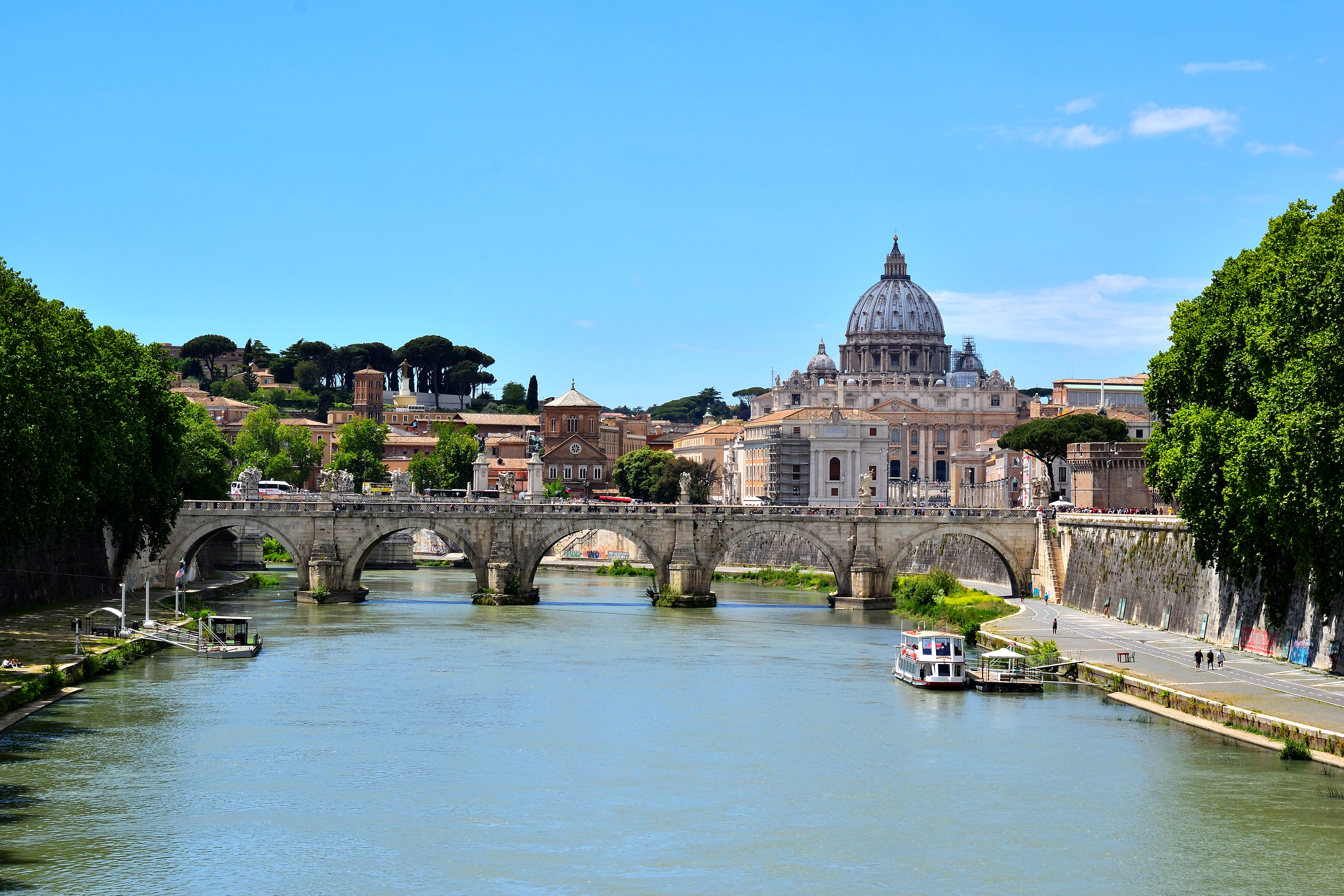
St. Peter's Basilica seen from the Tiber

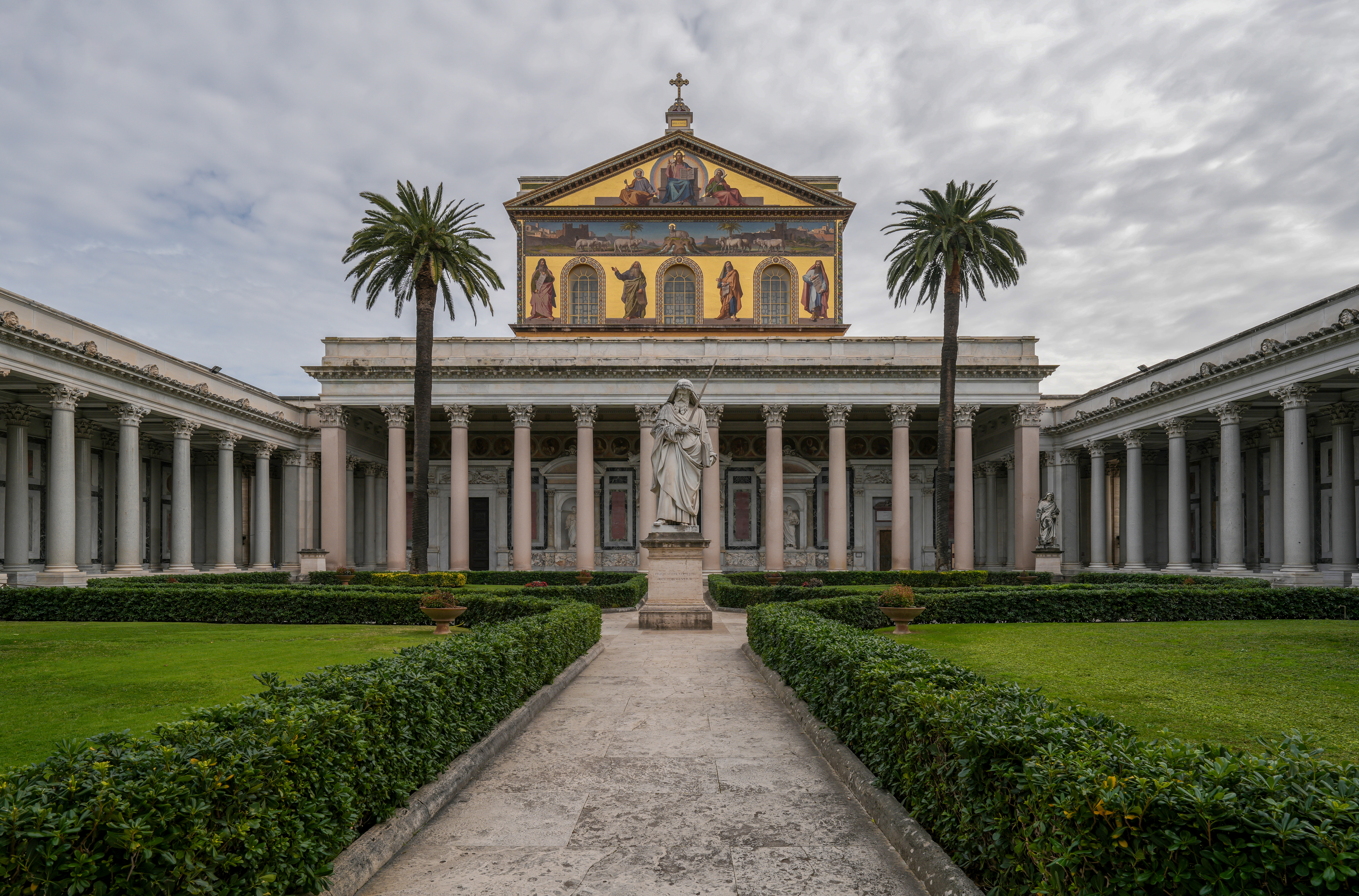
The Basilica of Saint Paul Outside the Walls, with a statue of St. Paul standing in front

This feast combines the standard celebration of the dedication of a church for St. Peter's Basilica and the Basilica of Saint Paul Outside the Walls, which were both built by the Emperor Constantine the Great during the 4th century. These sites had already been visited by pilgrims for over a century when the basilicas were built to honor the apostles traditionally believed to have been buried there. The basilicas were originally joined by a colonnade, which was built despite the distance of several miles between them.

Their significance in the Catholic Church is emphasized in the reference made to them in the obligation on Catholic bishops to make a Quinquennial visit ad limina in which they are required to go "to the tombs of the Apostles" in Rome every five years to report on the status of their dioceses or prelatures.

This requirement was initially set out in 1585 by Pope Sixtus V, who issued the papal bull Romanus Pontifex, which established the norms for these visits. On 31 December 1909, Pope Pius X decreed that a bishop needs to report to the pope an account of the state of his diocese once every five years, starting in 1911.

== See also ==
- Dedication of Saint Mary Major
- Dedication of Saint John Lateran
