= Dies Domini =

1998 apostolic letter

Dies Domini is an apostolic letter promulgated by Pope John Paul II on May 31, 1998, that encourages Catholics to 'rediscover the meaning' behind keeping Sunday holy.

It says:

The Paschal Mystery of Christ is the full revelation of the mystery of the world's origin, the climax of the history of salvation and the anticipation of the eschatological fulfilment of the world. What God accomplished in Creation and wrought for his People in the Exodus has found its fullest expression in Christ's Death and Resurrection, though its definitive fulfilment will not come until the Parousia, when Christ returns in glory. In him, the "spiritual" meaning of the Sabbath is fully realized, as Saint Gregory the Great declares: "For us, the true Sabbath is the person of our Redeemer, our Lord Jesus Christ."

— Dies Domini, 18

Speaking of the various dimensions of the Christian celebration of Sunday, the document says that it is Dies Domini with regard to the work of creation, Dies Christi as the day of the new creation and the Risen Lord's gift of the Holy Spirit, Dies Ecclesiae as the day on which the Christian community gathers for the celebration, and Dies Hominis as the day of joy, rest and fraternal charity.

== Contents ==
- Opening Section (1–7)
- Chapter 1 - DIES DOMINI: The Celebration of the Creator's Work (8–18)
- Chapter 2 - DIES CHRISTI: The Day of the Risen Lord and of the Gift of the Holy Spirit (19–30)
- Chapter 3 - DIES ECCLESIAE: The Eucharistic Assembly: Heart of Sunday (31–54)
- Chapter 4 - DIES HOMINIS: Sunday: Day of Joy, Rest and Solidarity (55–73)
- Chapter 5 - DIES DIERUM: Sunday: the Primordial Feast, Revealing the Meaning of Time (74–80)
- CONCLUSION (81–87)

== See also ==
- Sabbath in Christianity
- Sacrosanctum Concilium

== Bibliography ==
- John Paul II, (1998) "Apostolic letter Dies Domini of the Holy Father John Paul II to the Bishops, Clergy and Failthful of the Catholic Church On Keeping the Lord's Day Holy" APOSTOLIC LETTER DIES DOMINI. Access date:2018-12-09
