= Holy Trinity (El Greco) =

Painting by El Greco

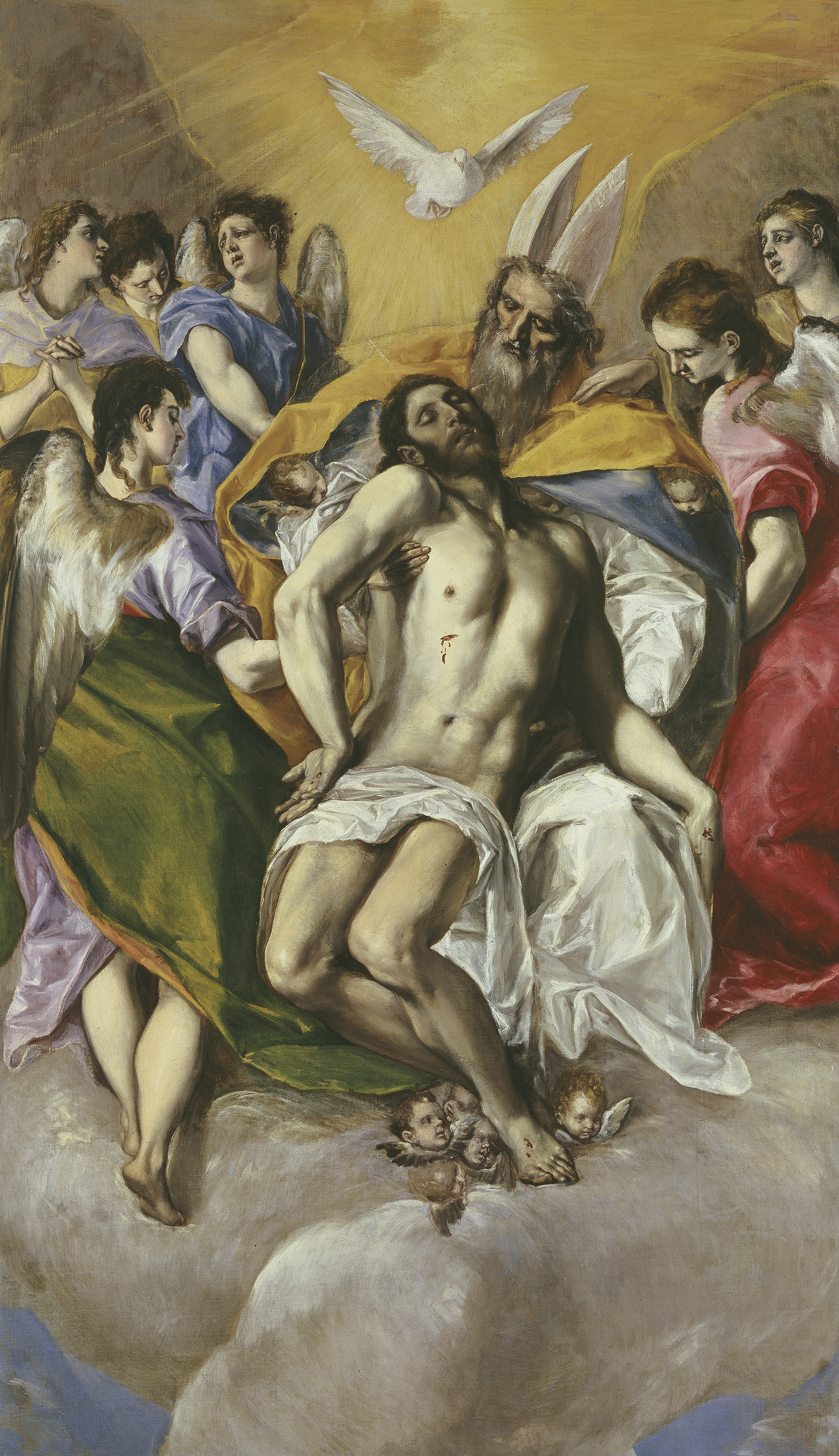

Holy Trinity is a c.1577–1579 oil on canvas painting by El Greco, one of nine works he produced for the Convent of Santo Domingo el Antiguo (Toledo). Ferdinand VII of Spain acquired it from the sculptor Valeriano Salvatierra in 1832 and it now hangs in the Prado Museum in Madrid.

It shows God the Father holding the dead body of God the Son, both under the dove of the Holy Spirit. The anatomy of the figures is influenced by that of Michelangelo, whilst the chromaticism recalls that of Tintoretto and the composition those of Albrecht Dürer.

== See also ==
- List of works by El Greco
