= Valeriano Salvatierra =

Spanish sculptor

Valeriano Salvatierra Barriales (14 April 1789 – 24 May 1836) was a Spanish sculptor.

== Life ==
The son of Faustina Barriales and sculptor Mariano Salvatierra, he was born in Toledo and initially trained in his father's studio before entering the Academia de Bellas Artes de San Fernando in 1807 and later spending time in Rome, where he met Canova and Thorwaldsen and gained praise for his own Achilles Pulling Out the Arrow, which was awarded a prize in 1813 by the Accademia di San Luca.

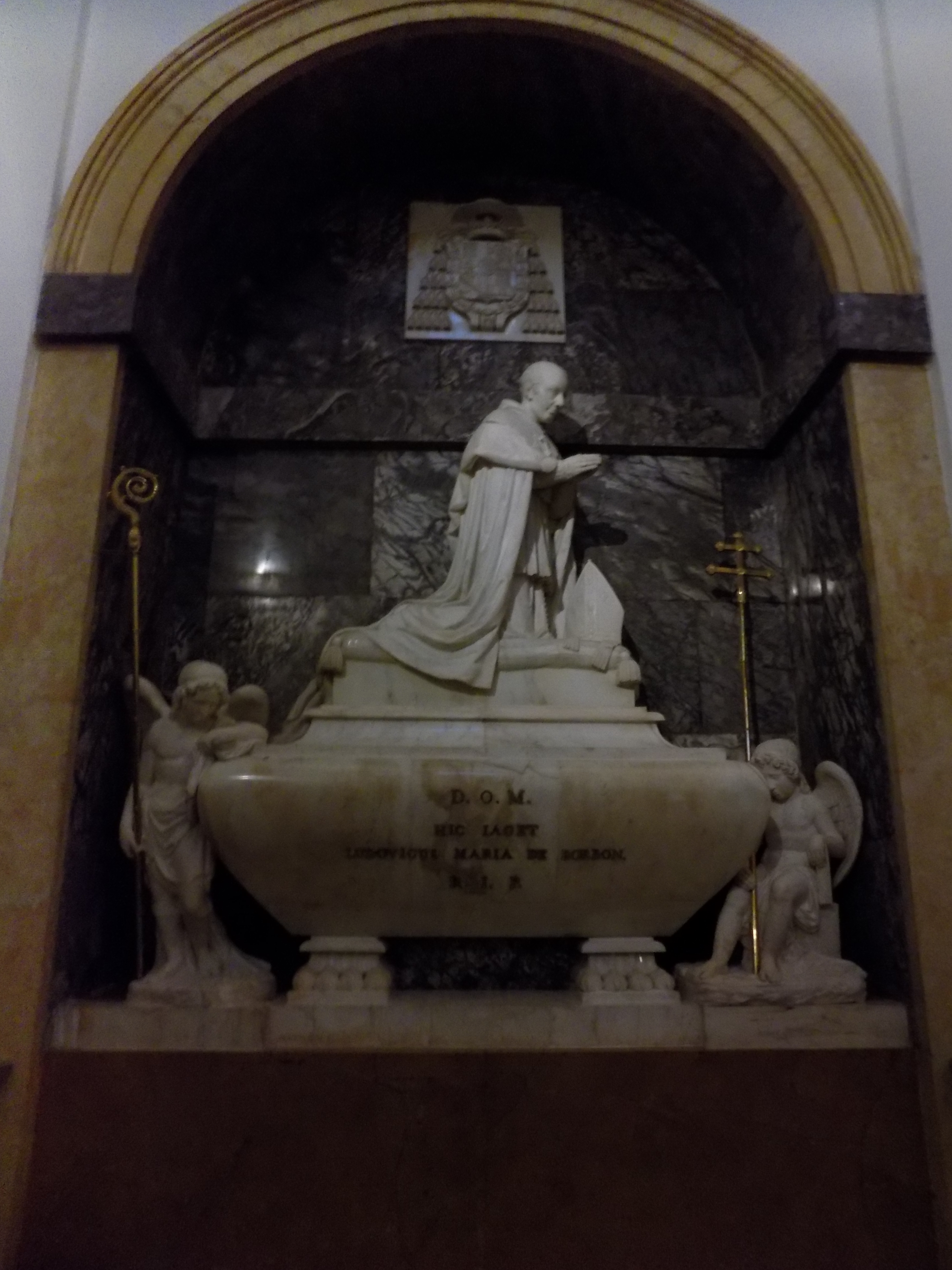
Grave monument of Luis María de Borbón

On returning to Spain he was made a professor at Toledo Cathedral and later joined the faculty of the Academia de San Fernando. In 1819 he was made honorary court sculptor to Ferdinand VII of Spain, becoming his chief sculptor after Ramón Barba's death in 1831. From 1827 onwards he worked on the restoration of the sculptures in the Real Museo de Pinturas (now the Museo del Prado) and created twelve allegorical sculptures for the Museo's facade. He died in Madrid in 1836.

== Selected works ==
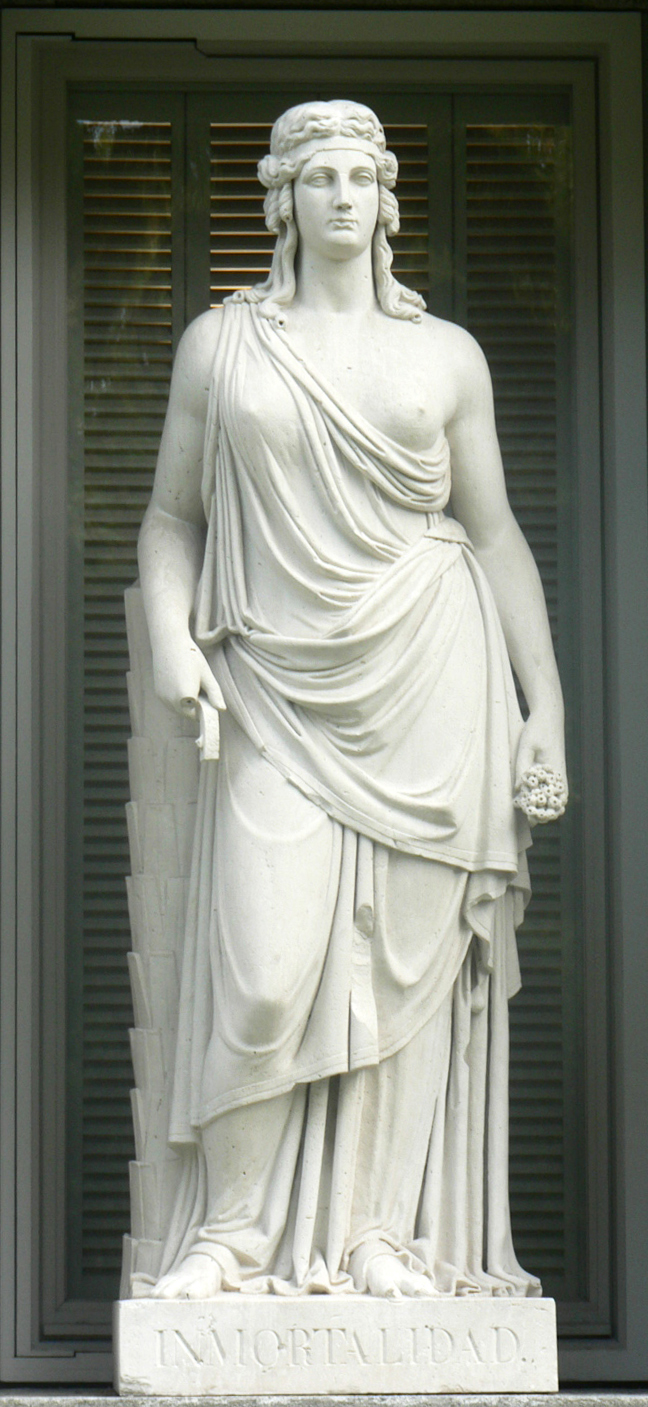
Immortality, sculpture on the Museo del Prado

- Crowning of the Puerta de Toledo (jointly with Ramón Barba)
- Portrait of Isidoro Máiquez (Museo de la Real Academia de San Fernando).
- Portrait of the painter José Aparicio.
- Grave monument of Cardinal don Luis de Borbón y Villabriga (Toledo Cathedral), sculpted in Rome in 1824, showing major influence from Canova and Bernini.
- Grave monument of the condesa de Chinchón (Palacio de Boadilla del Monte, Madrid).
