= Baltasar Elisio de Medinilla =

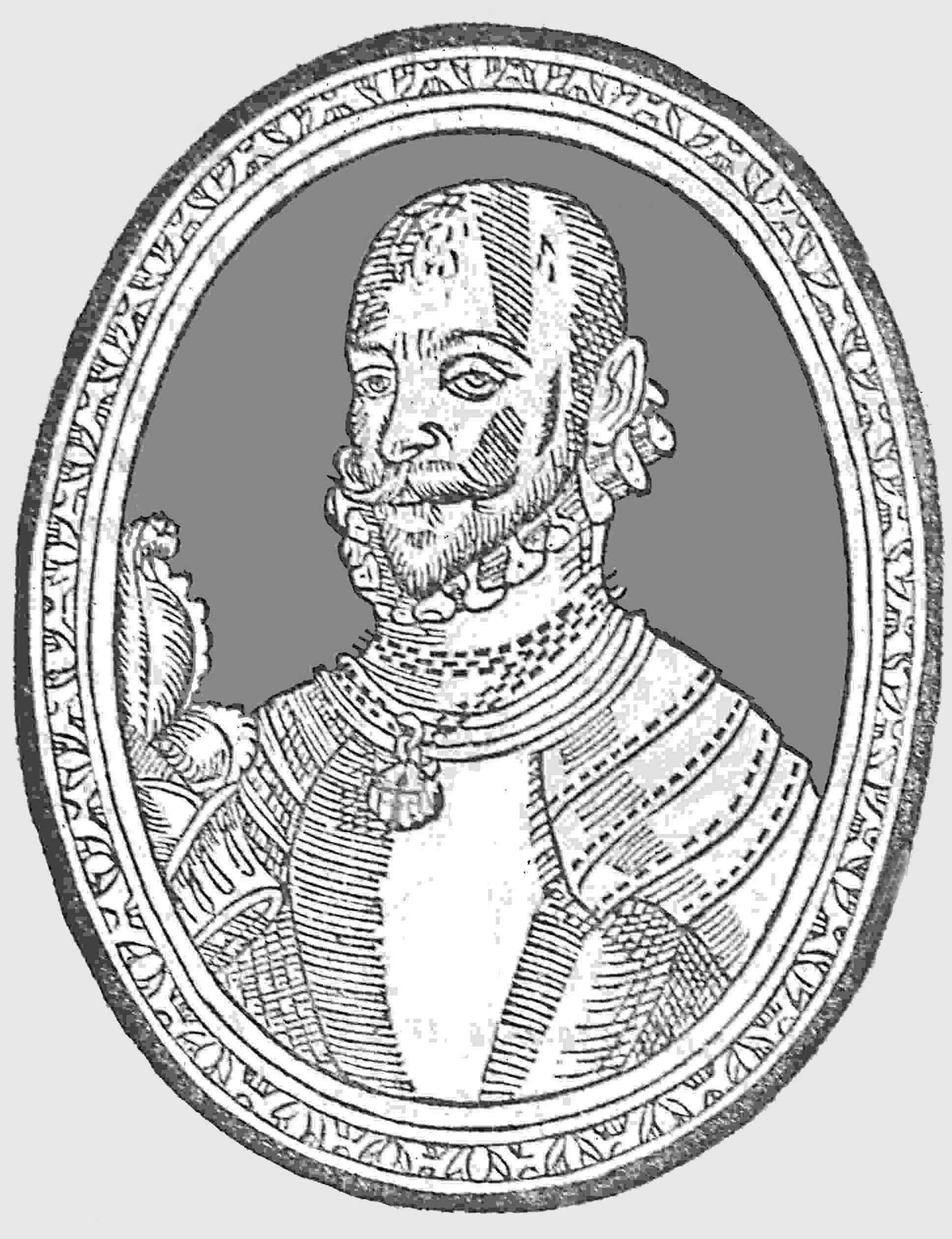
17th century portrait of the poet

Baltasar Elisio de Medinilla (28 June 1585 – 30 August 1620) was a Spanish poet and friend of the playwright Lope de Vega. He was born and died in Toledo.

== Works ==
=== Poems ===
- Limpia Concepción de la Virgen Nuestra Señora, Madrid 1617, 2. ibd. 1618
- Algunas obras divinas, manuscrito, BNM 3954
- Descripción de Buenavista, manuscrito, 1. BNM 3954, 2. BNM 4266

=== Prose ===
- A la imperial ciudad de Toledo, 1618
- A Lope de Vega Carpio en la muerte de Carlos Félix, su hijo, consolación, BNM, 4266
- El Vega. De la Poética Española. Dialogo literario, BNM, 4266
- A los aficionados a los escritos de Lope de Vega Carpio, prólogo de Jerusalén conquistada, Madrid, Juan de la Cuesta, 1609

== Sources ==
- Madroñal Durán, Abraham: Baltasar Elisio de Medinilla y la poesía Toledana de principios del Siglo XVII. Con la edición de sus "Obras divinas", Vervuert, 1999, ISBN 3-89354-392-9
