= El Greco =

Greek painter of the Spanish Renaissance (1541–1614)

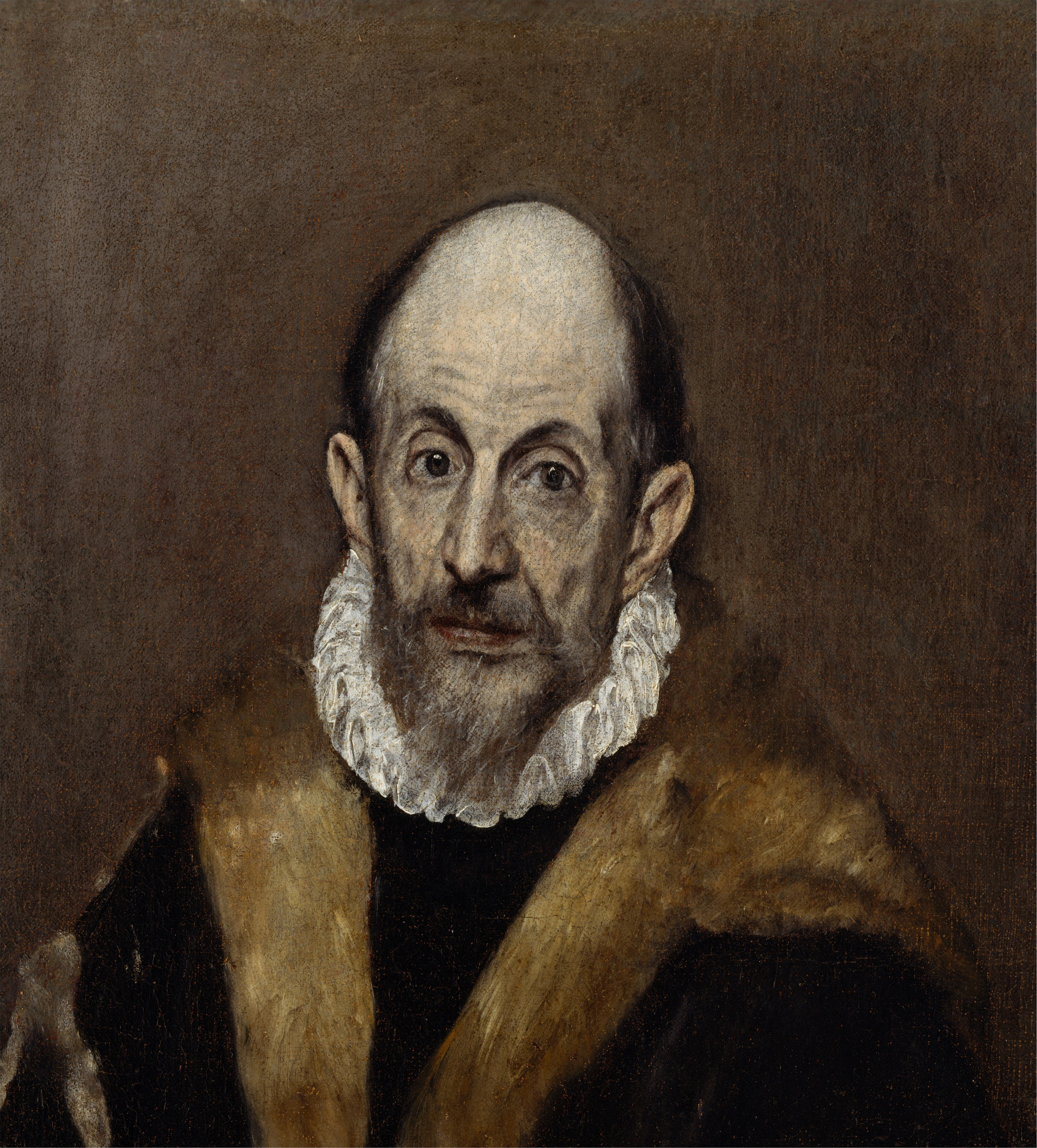
- Portrait of a Man, a presumed self-portrait c. 1595–1600, Metropolitan Museum of Art
- Born: Doménikos Theotokópoulos; 1 October 1541 either Fodele or Candia, Crete, Republic of Venice
- Died: 7 April 1614 (aged 72); Toledo, Kingdom of Spain
- Known for: Painting; sculpture; architecture
- Notable work: The Disrobing of Christ (1577–1579); Assumption of the Virgin (1577–1579); The Burial of the Count of Orgaz (1586–1588); View of Toledo (1596–1600); Opening of the Fifth Seal (1608–1614)
- Movement: Cretan School; Mannerism; Spanish Renaissance
- Children: Jorge Manuel Theotocópuli

Doménikos Theotokópoulos (Greek: Δομήνικος Θεοτοκόπουλος, pronounced [ðoˈminikos θeotoˈkopulos]; 1 October 1541 – 7 April 1614), most widely known as El Greco (Spanish pronunciation: [el ˈɣɾeko]; "The Greek"), was a Greek painter, sculptor and architect of the Spanish Renaissance, regarded as one of the greatest artists of all time. El Greco was a nickname, (Note: Theotokópoulos acquired the name El Greco in Italy, where the custom of identifying a man by designating a country or city of origin was a common practice. The curious form of the article (El) may be from the Venetian language or more likely from the Spanish, though in Spanish his name would be El Griego. The Cretan master was generally known in Italy and Spain as Dominico Greco, and was called only after his death El Greco. According to a contemporary, El Greco acquired his name not only for his place of origin, but also for the sublimity of his art: "Out of the great esteem he was held in he was called the Greek (Il Greco)" (comment of Giulio Cesare Mancini about El Greco in his Chronicles, which were written a few years after El Greco's death).) and the artist normally signed his paintings with his full birth name in Greek letters often adding the word Κρής (Krḗs), which means "Cretan" in Ancient Greek.

El Greco was born in the Kingdom of Candia (modern Crete), which was at that time part of the Republic of Venice, and the center of Post-Byzantine art. He trained and became a master within that tradition before traveling at age 26 to Venice, as other Greek artists had done. In 1570, he moved to Rome, where he opened a workshop and executed a series of works. During his stay in Italy, El Greco enriched his style with elements of Mannerism and of the Venetian Renaissance taken from a number of great artists of the time, notably Tintoretto and Titian. In 1577, he moved to Toledo, Spain, where he lived and worked until his death. In Toledo, El Greco received several major commissions and produced his best-known paintings, such as View of Toledo and Opening of the Fifth Seal.

El Greco's dramatic and expressionistic style was met with puzzlement by his contemporaries but found appreciation by the 20th century. El Greco is regarded as a precursor of both Expressionism and Cubism, while his personality and works were a source of inspiration for poets and writers such as Rainer Maria Rilke and Nikos Kazantzakis. El Greco has been characterized by modern scholars as an artist so individual that he belongs to no conventional school. He is best known for tortuously elongated figures and often fantastic or phantasmagorical pigmentation, marrying Byzantine traditions with those of Western painting.

Although mostly ignored by his contemporaries, El Greco is considered one of the greatest painters in the history of art. Art critics have resolutely placed him among the best artists of all time, citing his originality, his power of expression, and his innovative use of form and colour. His works are seen as transcending and surpassing the artistic traditions from which they emerged and as having had a profound effect on generations of later artists, including Francisco Goya, Diego Velázquez, Eugène Delacroix, Édouard Manet, Salvador Dalí and Pablo Picasso, amongst many others.

== Life ==
=== Early years and family ===
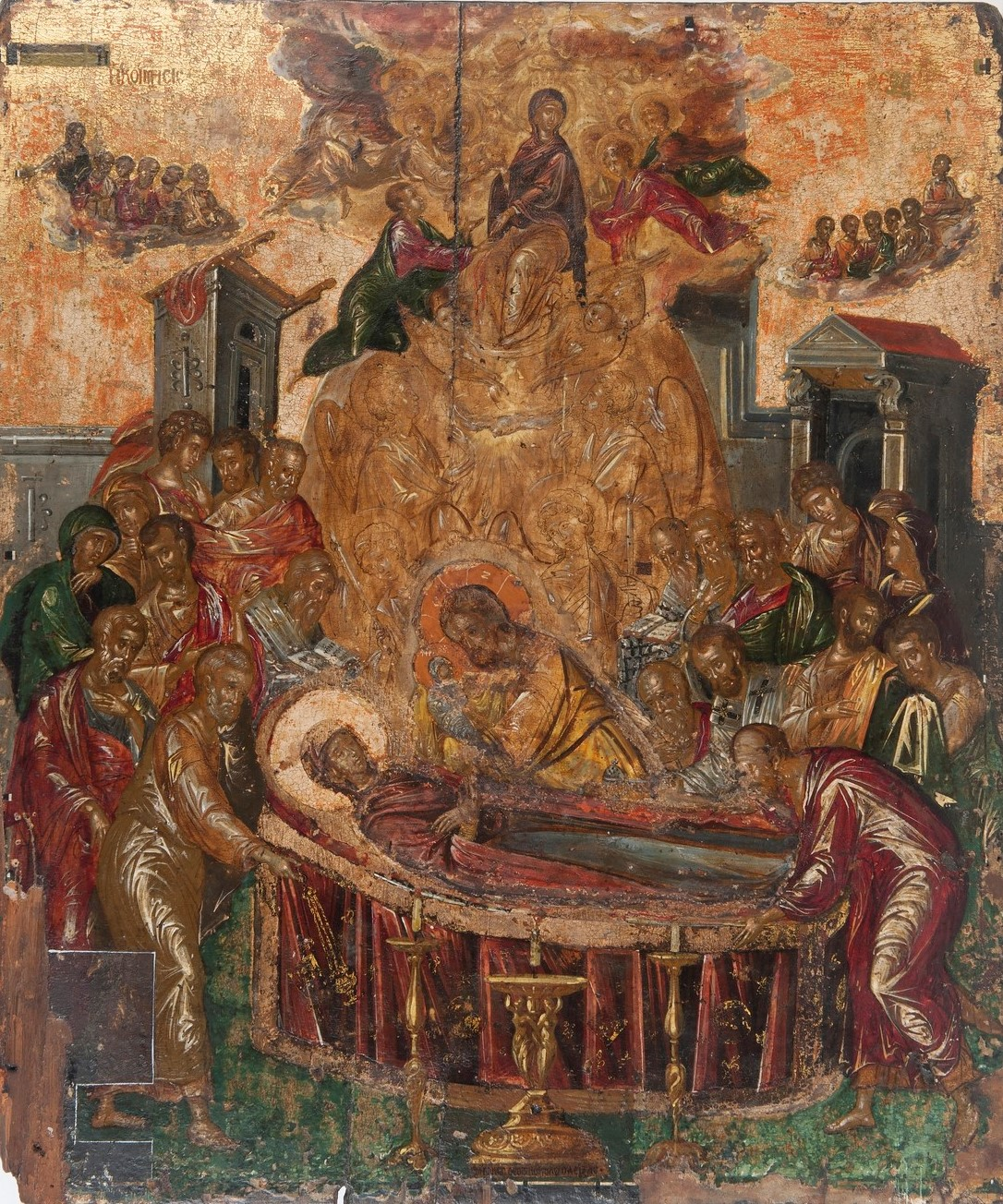
The Dormition of the Virgin (before 1567, tempera and gold on panel, 61.4 × 45 cm, Holy Cathedral of the Dormition of the Virgin, Hermoupolis, Syros) was probably created near the end of the artist's Cretan period. The painting combines post-Byzantine and Italian mannerist stylistic and iconographic elements.

Born in 1541, in either the village of Fodele or Candia (the Venetian name of Chandax, present day Heraklion) on Crete, (Note: There is an ongoing dispute about El Greco's birthplace. Most researchers and scholars give Candia as his birthplace. Nonetheless, according to Achileus A. Kyrou, a prominent Greek journalist of the 20th century, El Greco was born in Fodele and the ruins of his family's house are still extant in the place where old Fodele was (the village later changed location because of pirate raids). Candia's claim to him is based on two documents from a trial in 1606, when the painter was 65. Fodele natives argue that El Greco probably told everyone in Spain he was from Heraklion because it was the closest known city next to tiny Fodele.) El Greco was descended from a prosperous urban family, which had probably been driven out of Chania to Candia after an uprising against the Catholic Venetians between 1526 and 1528. El Greco's father, Geṓrgios Theotokópoulos (Γεώργιος Θεοτοκόπουλος; d. 1556), was a merchant and tax collector. Almost nothing is known about his mother or his first wife, except that they were also Greek. His second wife was a Spaniard. El Greco's older brother, Manoússos Theotokópoulos (1531–1604), was a wealthy merchant and spent the last years of his life (1603–1604) in El Greco's Toledo home.

El Greco received his initial training as an icon painter of the Cretan school, a leading center of post-Byzantine art. In addition to painting, he probably studied the classics of ancient Greece, and perhaps the Latin classics also; he left a "working library" of 130 volumes at his death, including the Bible in Greek and an annotated Vasari book. Candia was a center for artistic activity, where around two hundred painters were active during the 16th century, and had organized a painters' guild, based on the Italian model. In 1563, at the age of twenty-two, El Greco was described in a document as a "master" ("maestro Domenigo"), meaning he was already a master of the guild and presumably operating his own workshop. Three years later, in June 1566, as a witness to a contract, he signed his name in Greek as μαΐστρος Μένεγος Θεοτοκόπουλος σγουράφος (maḯstros Ménegos Theotokópoulos sgouráfos; "Master Ménegos Theotokópoulos, painter"). (Note: This document comes from the notarial archives of Candia and was published in 1962. Ménego is the Venetian form of Domḗnikos, and sgouráfos is a Greek term for painter, a corruption of zōgráfos (ζωγράφος).)

Most scholars believe that the Theotokópoulos "family was almost certainly Greek Orthodox", although some Catholic sources still claim him from birth. (Note: The arguments of these Catholic sources are based on the lack of Orthodox archival baptismal records on Crete and on a relaxed interchange between Greek Orthodox and Roman Catholic rites during El Greco's youth. Based on the assessment that his art reflects the religious spirit of Roman Catholic Spain, and on a reference in his last will and testament, where he described himself as a "devout Catholic", some scholars assume that El Greco was part of the vibrant Catholic Cretan minority or that he converted from Greek Orthodoxy to Roman Catholicism before leaving the island.) Like many Orthodox emigrants to Catholic areas of Europe, some assert that he may have transferred to Catholicism after his arrival, and possibly practiced as a Catholic in Spain, where he described himself as a "devout Catholic" in his will. The extensive archival research conducted since the early 1960s by scholars, such as Nikolaos Panayotakis, Pandelis Prevelakis and Maria Constantoudaki, indicates strongly that El Greco's family and ancestors were Greek Orthodox. One of his uncles was an Orthodox priest, and his name is not mentioned in the Catholic archival baptismal records on Crete. Prevelakis goes even further, expressing his doubt that El Greco was ever a practicing Roman Catholic.

Important for his early biography, El Greco, still in Crete, painted his Dormition of the Virgin near the end of his Cretan period, probably before 1567. Three other signed works of "Domḗnicos" are attributed to El Greco (Modena Triptych, St. Luke Painting the Virgin and Child, and The Adoration of the Magi).

=== Italy ===
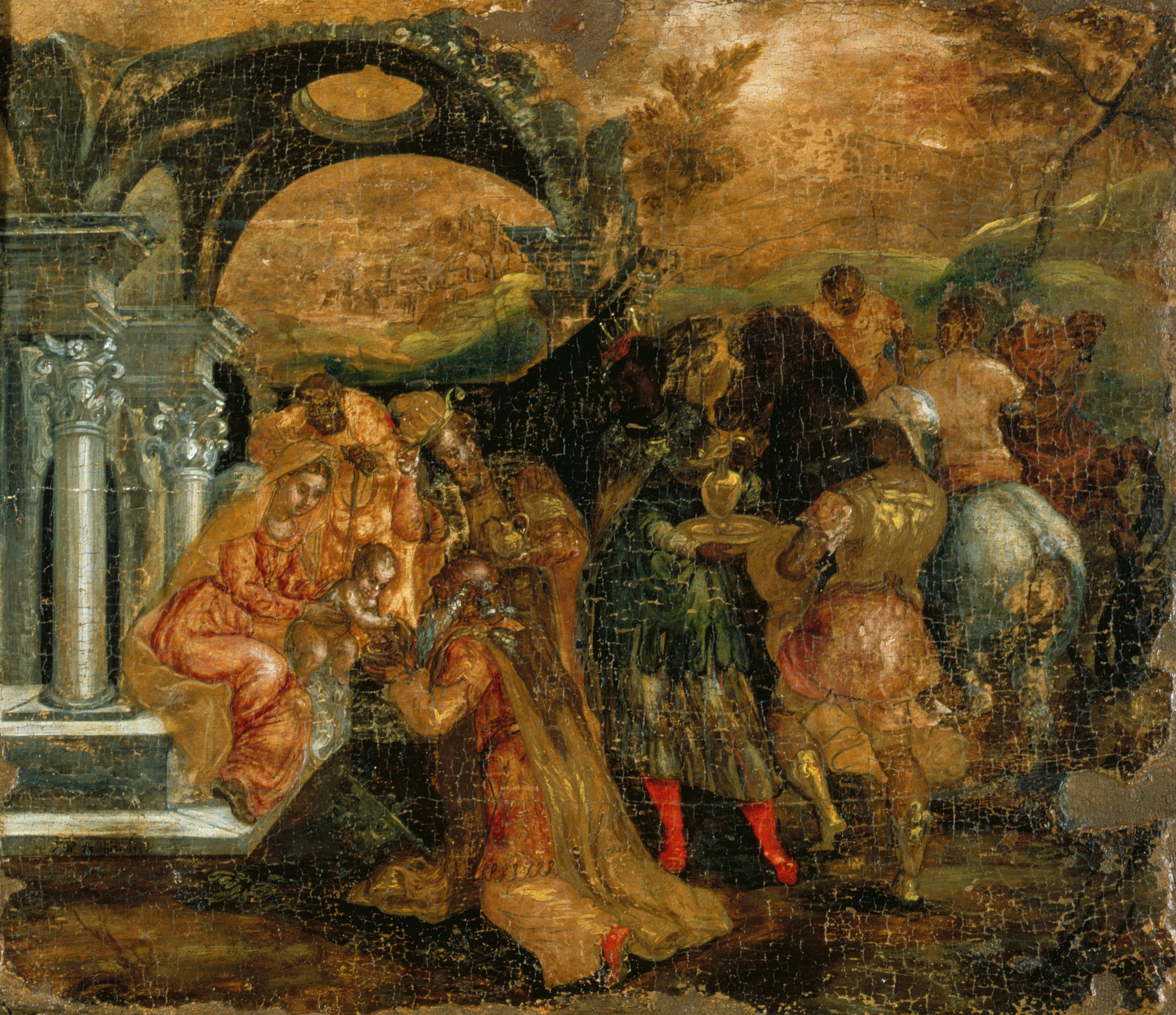
The Adoration of the Magi (1565–1567, 56 × 62 cm, Benaki Museum, Athens). The icon, signed by El Greco ("Χείρ Δομήνιχου", Created by the hand of Doménicos), was painted in Candia on part of an old chest.

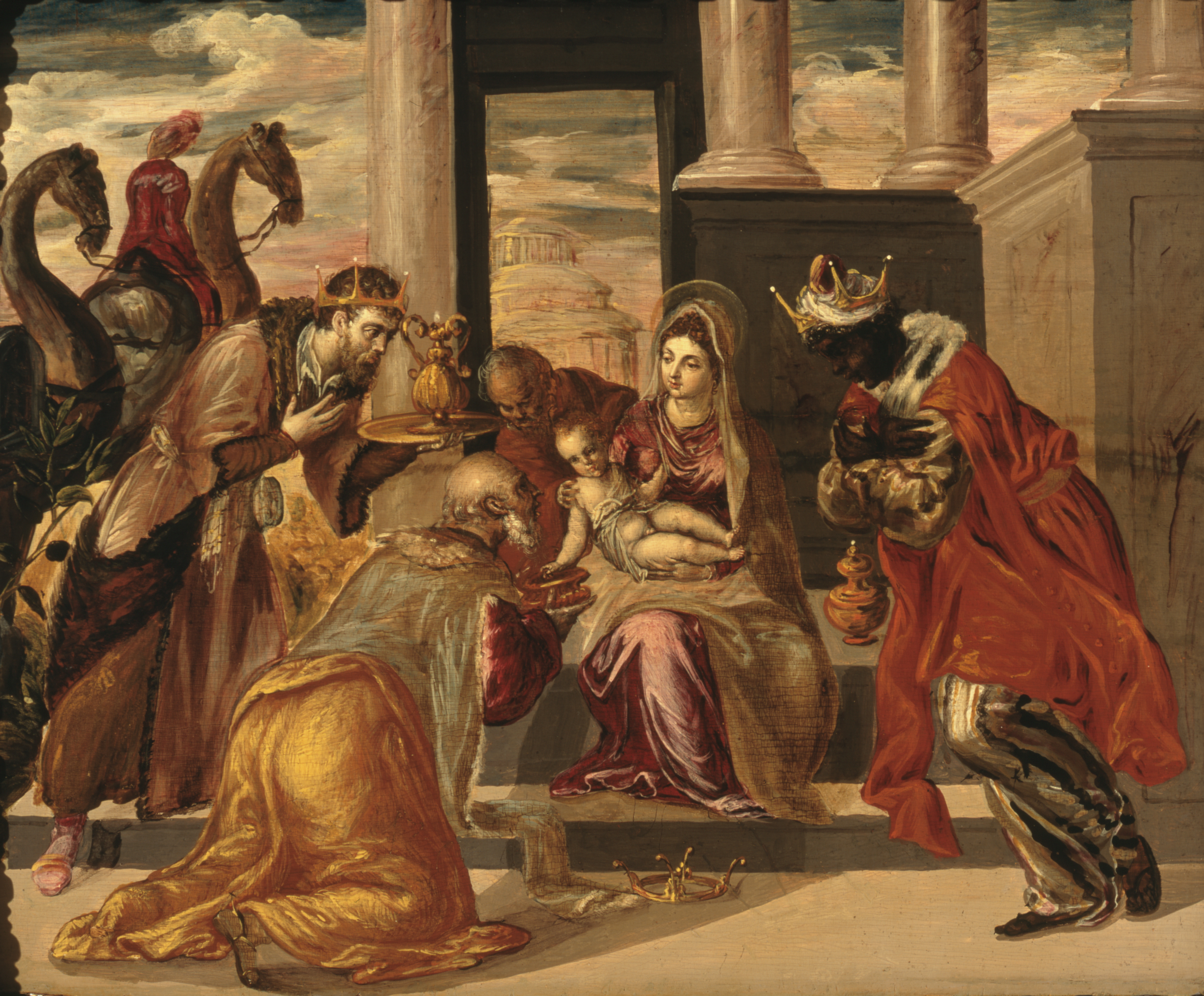
Adoration of the Magi, 1568, Museo Soumaya, Mexico City

It was natural for the young El Greco to pursue his career in Venice, Crete having been a possession of the Republic of Venice since 1211. Though the exact year is not clear, most scholars agree that El Greco went to Venice around 1567. (Note: According to archival research in the late 1990s, El Greco was still in Candia at the age of twenty-six. It was there where his works, created in the spirit of the post-Byzantine painters of the Cretan School, were greatly esteemed. On 26 December 1566 El Greco sought permission from the Venetian authorities to sell a "panel of the Passion of Christ executed on a gold background" ("un quadro della Passione del Nostro Signor Giesu Christo, dorato") in a lottery. The Byzantine icon by young Doménicos depicting the Passion of Christ, painted on a gold ground, was appraised and sold on 27 December 1566 in Candia for the agreed price of seventy gold ducats (The panel was valued by two artists; one of them was icon-painter Georgios Klontzas. One valuation was eighty ducats and the other seventy), equal in value to a work by Titian or Tintoretto of that period. Therefore, it seems that El Greco traveled to Venice sometime after 27 December 1566. In one of his last articles, Wethey reassessed his previous estimations and accepted that El Greco left Crete in 1567. According to other archival material—drawings El Greco sent to a Cretan cartographer—he was in Venice by 1568.) Knowledge of El Greco's years in Italy is limited. He lived in Venice until 1570 and, according to a letter written by his much older friend, the greatest miniaturist of the age, Giulio Clovio, was a "disciple" of Titian, who was by then in his eighties but still vigorous. This may mean he worked in Titian's large studio, or not. Clovio characterized El Greco as "a rare talent in painting".

In 1570, El Greco moved to Rome, where he executed a series of works strongly marked by his Venetian apprenticeship. It is unknown how long he remained in Rome, though he may have returned to Venice (c. 1575–76) before he left for Spain. In Rome, on the recommendation of Giulio Clovio, El Greco was received as a guest at the Palazzo Farnese, which Cardinal Alessandro Farnese had made a center of the artistic and intellectual life of the city. There he came into contact with the intellectual elite of the city, including the Roman scholar Fulvio Orsini, whose collection would later include seven paintings by the artist (View of Mt. Sinai and a portrait of Clovio are among them).

Unlike other Cretan artists who had moved to Venice, El Greco substantially altered his style and sought to distinguish himself by inventing new and unusual interpretations of traditional religious subject matter. His works painted in Italy were influenced by the Venetian Renaissance style of the period, with agile, elongated figures reminiscent of Tintoretto and a chromatic framework that connects him to Titian. The Venetian painters also taught him to organize his multi-figured compositions in landscapes vibrant with atmospheric light. Clovio reports visiting El Greco on a summer's day while the artist was still in Rome. El Greco was sitting in a darkened room, because he found the darkness more conducive to thought than the light of the day, which disturbed his "inner light". As a result of his stay in Rome, his works were enriched with elements such as violent perspective vanishing points or strange attitudes struck by the figures with their repeated twisting and turning and tempestuous gestures, all elements of Mannerism.

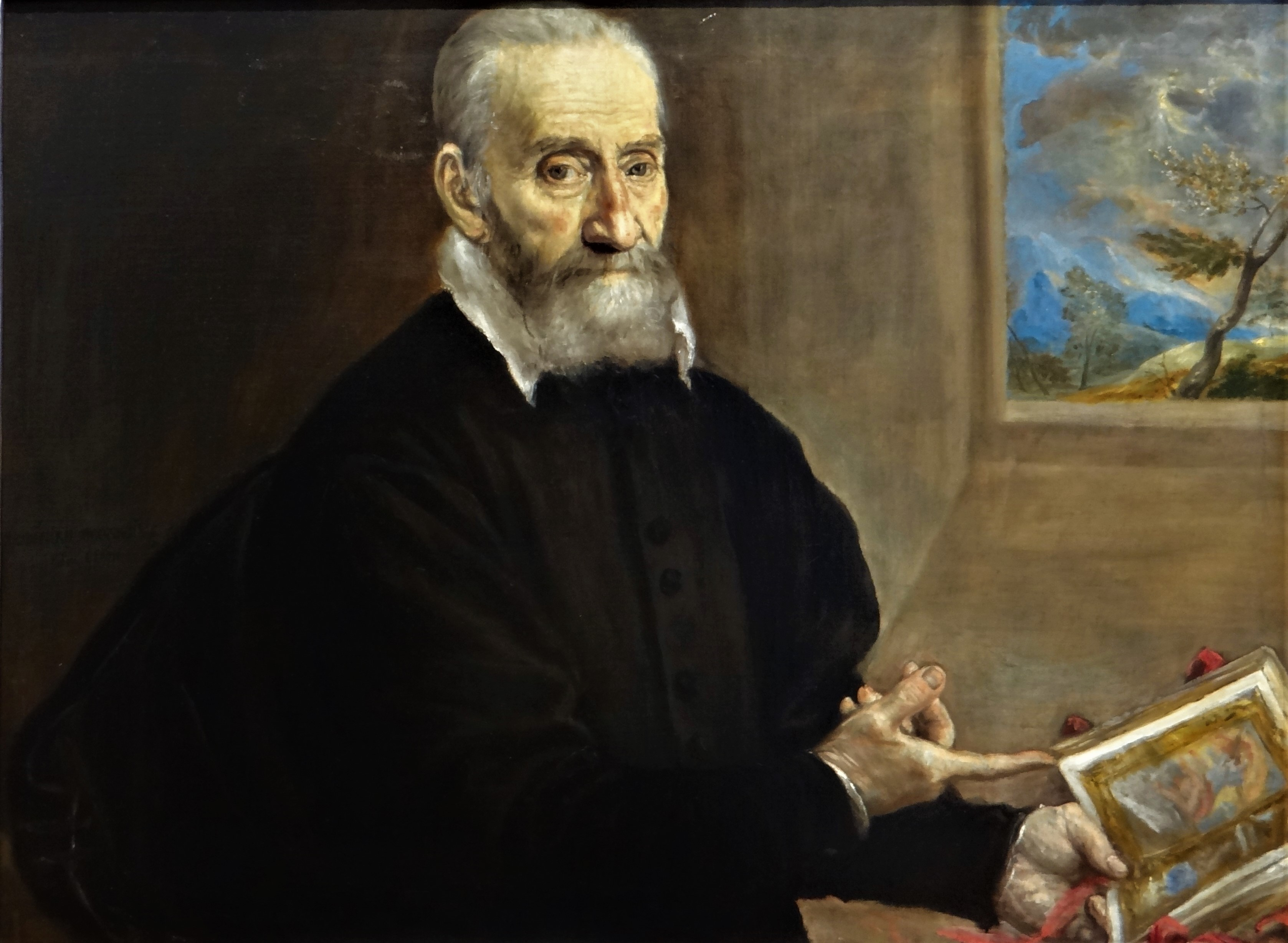
Portrait of Giorgio Giulio Clovio, the earliest surviving portrait from El Greco (1571, oil on canvas, 58 × 86 cm, Museo di Capodimonte, Naples). In the portrait of Clovio, friend and supporter in Rome of the young Cretan artist, the first evidence of El Greco's gifts as a portraitist are apparent.

By the time El Greco arrived in Rome, Michelangelo and Raphael were dead, but their example continued to be paramount, and somewhat overwhelming for young painters. El Greco was determined to make his own mark in Rome defending his personal artistic views, ideas and style. He singled out Correggio and Parmigianino for particular praise, but he did not hesitate to dismiss Michelangelo's Last Judgment in the Sistine Chapel; (Note: Mancini reports that El Greco said to the Pope that if the whole work was demolished he himself would do it in a decent manner and with seemliness.) he extended an offer to Pope Pius V to paint over the whole work in accord with the new and stricter Catholic thinking. When he was later asked what he thought about Michelangelo, El Greco replied that "he was a good man, but he did not know how to paint". However, despite El Greco's criticism, Michelangelo's influence can be seen in later El Greco works such as the Allegory of the Holy League. By painting portraits of Michelangelo, Titian, Clovio and, presumably, Raphael in one of his works (The Purification of the Temple), El Greco not only expressed his gratitude but also advanced the claim to rival these masters. As his own commentaries indicate, El Greco viewed Titian, Michelangelo and Raphael as models to emulate. In his 17th century Chronicles, Giulio Mancini included El Greco among the painters who had initiated, in various ways, a re-evaluation of Michelangelo's teachings.

Because of his unconventional artistic beliefs (such as his dismissal of Michelangelo's technique) and personality, El Greco soon acquired enemies in Rome. Architect and writer Pirro Ligorio called him a "foolish foreigner", and newly discovered archival material reveals a skirmish with Farnese, who obliged the young artist to leave his palace. On 6 July 1572, El Greco officially complained about this event. A few months later, on 18 September 1572, he paid his dues to the Guild of Saint Luke in Rome as a miniature painter. At the end of that year, El Greco opened his own workshop and hired as assistants the painters Lattanzio Bonastri de Lucignano and Francisco Preboste.

=== Spain ===
==== Move to Toledo ====
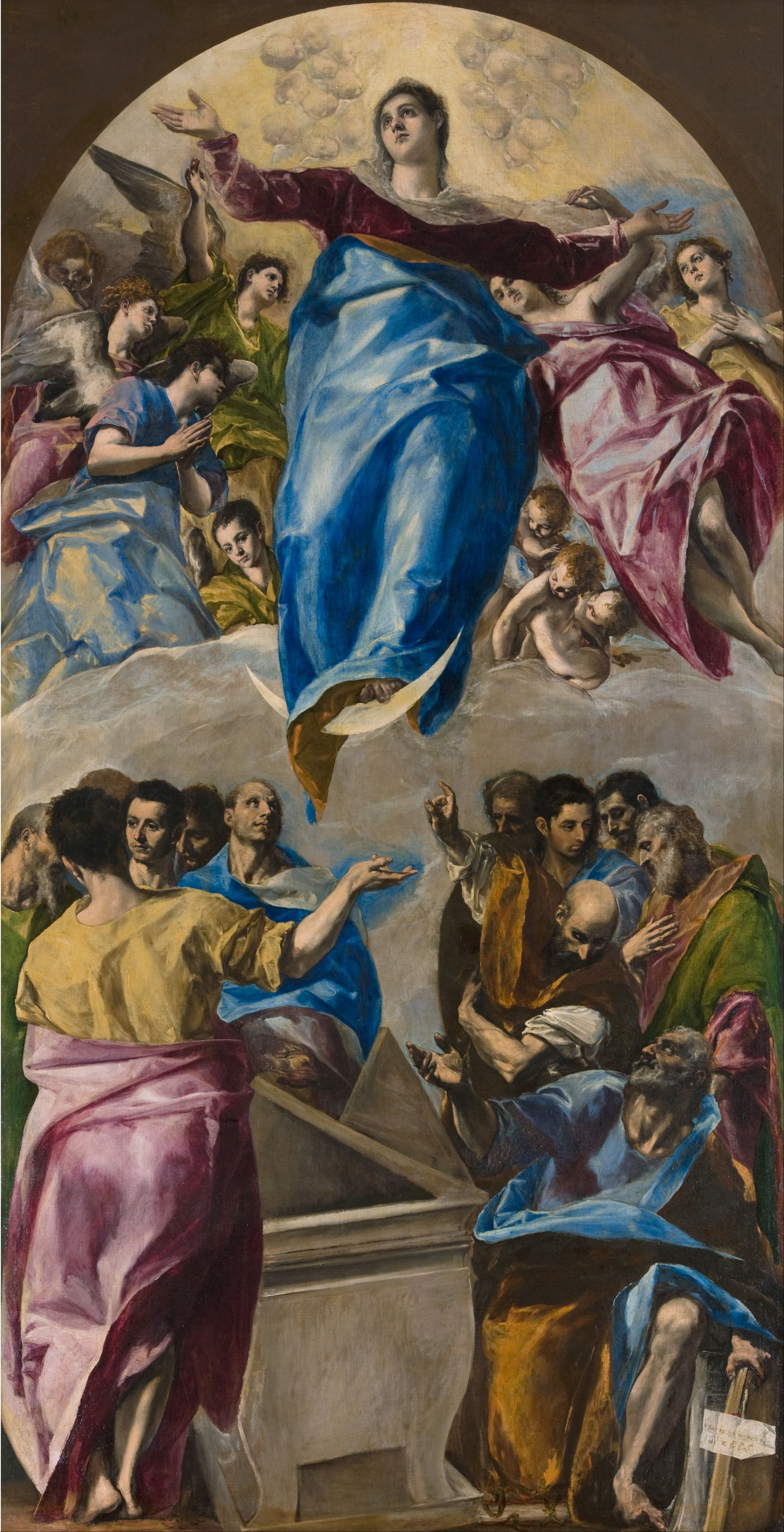
The Assumption of the Virgin (1577–1579, oil on canvas, 401 × 228 cm, Art Institute of Chicago) was one of the nine paintings El Greco completed for the church of Santo Domingo el Antiguo in Toledo, his first commission in Spain.

In 1577, El Greco migrated to Madrid and then to Toledo, where he produced his mature works. At the time, Toledo was the religious capital of Spain and a populous city (Note: Toledo must have been one of the largest cities in Europe during this period. In 1571 the population of the city was 62,000.) with "an illustrious past, a prosperous present and an uncertain future". In Rome, El Greco had earned the respect of some intellectuals, but was also facing the hostility of certain art critics. During the 1570s the huge monastery-palace of El Escorial was still under construction and Philip II of Spain was experiencing difficulties in finding good artists for the many large paintings required to decorate it. Titian was dead, and Tintoretto, Veronese and Anthonis Mor all refused to come to Spain. Philip had to rely on the lesser talent of Juan Fernández de Navarrete, of whose gravedad y decoro ("seriousness and decorum") the king approved. When Fernández died in 1579, the moment was ideal for El Greco to move to Toledo.

Through Clovio and Orsini, El Greco met Benito Arias Montano, a Spanish humanist and agent of Philip; Pedro Chacón, a clergyman; and Luis de Castilla, son of Diego de Castilla, the dean of the Cathedral of Toledo. El Greco's friendship with Castilla would secure his first large commissions in Toledo. He arrived in Toledo by July 1577, and signed contracts for a group of paintings that was to adorn the church of Santo Domingo el Antiguo in Toledo and for El Espolio. By September 1579 he had completed nine paintings for Santo Domingo, including The Trinity and The Assumption of the Virgin. These works would establish the painter's reputation in Toledo.

El Greco did not plan to settle permanently in Toledo, since his final aim was to win the favor of Philip and make his mark in his court. Indeed, he did manage to secure two important commissions from the monarch: Allegory of the Holy League and Martyrdom of St. Maurice. However, the king did not like these works and placed the St Maurice altarpiece in the chapter-house rather than the intended chapel. He gave no further commissions to El Greco. The exact reasons for the king's dissatisfaction remain unclear. Some scholars have suggested that Philip did not like the inclusion of living persons in a religious scene; some others that El Greco's works violated a basic rule of the Counter-Reformation, namely that in the image the content was paramount rather than the style. Philip took a close interest in his artistic commissions, and had very decided tastes; a long sought-after sculpted Crucifixion by Benvenuto Cellini also failed to please when it arrived, and was likewise exiled to a less prominent place. Philip's next experiment, with Federico Zuccari was even less successful. In any case, Philip's dissatisfaction ended any hopes of royal patronage El Greco may have had.

==== Mature works and later years ====
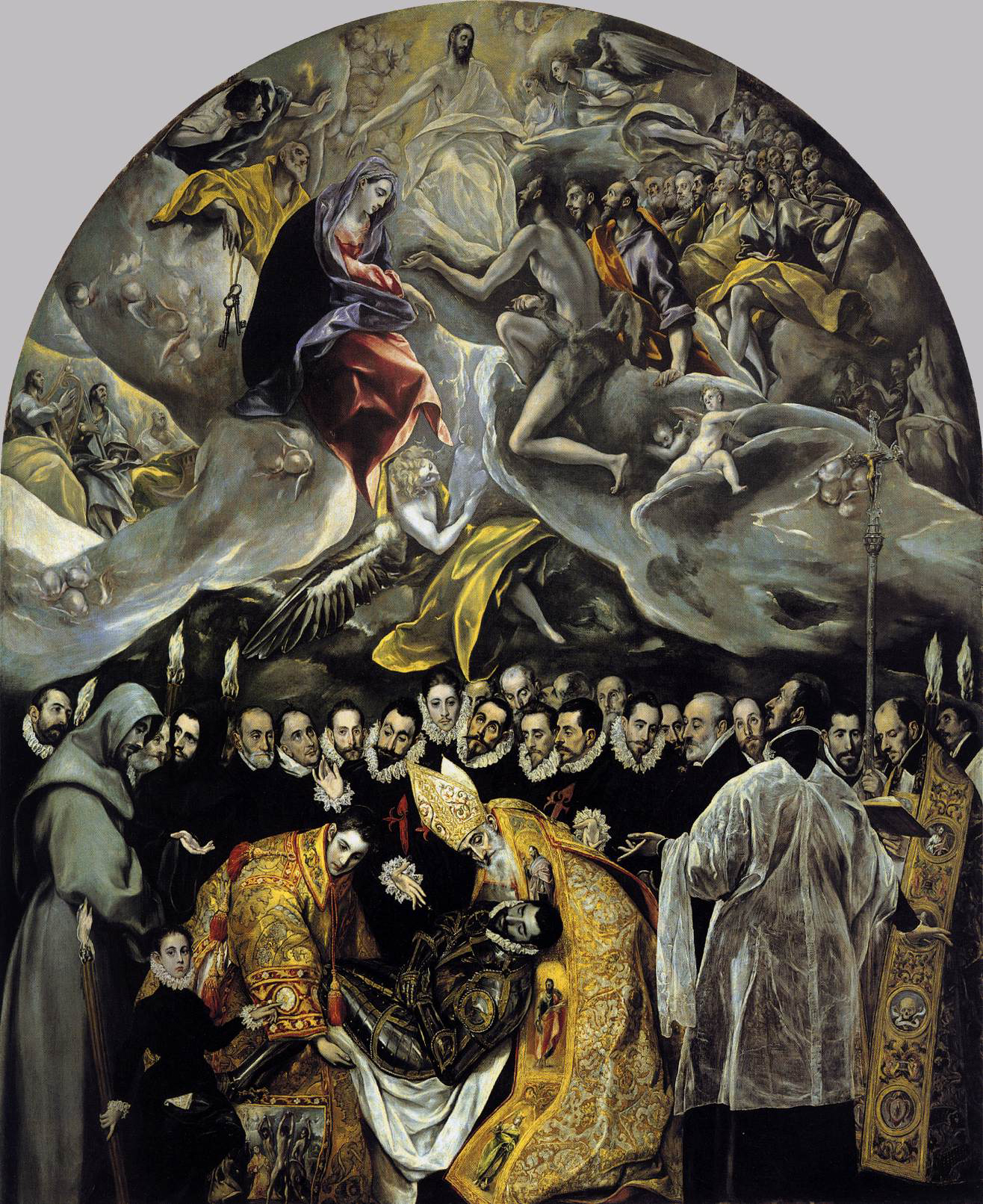
The Burial of the Count of Orgaz (1586–1588, oil on canvas, 480 × 360 cm, church of Santo Tomé, Toledo), now El Greco's best known work, illustrates a popular local legend. An exceptionally large painting, it is clearly divided into two zones: the heavenly above and the terrestrial below, brought together compositionally.

Lacking the favor of the king, El Greco was obliged to remain in Toledo, where he had been received in 1577 as a great painter. According to Hortensio Félix Paravicino, a 17th-century Spanish preacher and poet, "Crete gave him life and the painter's craft, Toledo a better homeland, where through Death he began to achieve eternal life." In 1585, he appears to have hired an assistant, Italian painter Francisco Preboste, and to have established a workshop capable of producing altar frames and statues as well as paintings. On 12 March 1586 he obtained the commission for The Burial of the Count of Orgaz, now his best-known work.

The decade 1597 to 1607 was a period of intense activity for El Greco. During these years he received several major commissions, and his workshop created pictorial and sculptural ensembles for a variety of religious institutions. Among his major commissions of this period were three altars for the Chapel of San José in Toledo (1597–1599); three paintings (1596–1600) for the Colegio de Doña María de Aragon, an Augustinian monastery in Madrid, and the high altar, four lateral altars, and the painting St. Ildefonso for the Capilla Mayor of the Hospital de la Caridad (Hospital of Charity) at Illescas (1603–1605). The minutes of the commission of The Virgin of the Immaculate Conception (1607–1613), which were composed by the personnel of the municipality, describe El Greco as "one of the greatest men in both this kingdom and outside it".

Between 1607 and 1608 El Greco was involved in a protracted legal dispute with the authorities of the Hospital of Charity at Illescas concerning payment for his work, which included painting, sculpture and architecture; (Note: El Greco signed the contract for the decoration of the high altar of the church of the Hospital of Charity on 18 June 1603. He agreed to finish the work by August of the following year. Although such deadlines were seldom met, it was a point of potential conflict. He also agreed to allow the brotherhood to select the appraisers. The brotherhood took advantage of this act of good faith and did not wish to arrive at a fair settlement. Finally, El Greco assigned his legal representation to Preboste and a friend of him, Francisco Ximénez Montero, and accepted a payment of 2,093 ducats.) this and other legal disputes contributed to the economic difficulties he experienced towards the end of his life. In 1608, he received his last major commission at the Hospital of Saint John the Baptist in Toledo.

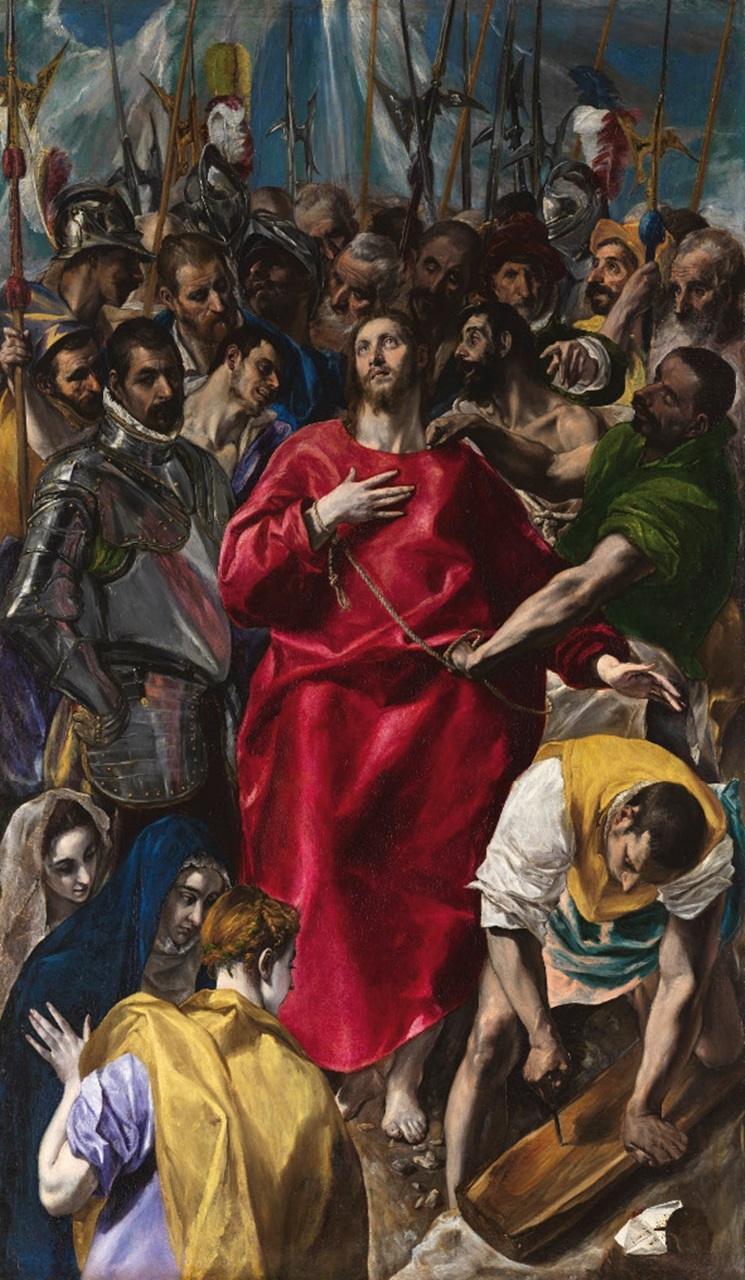
The Disrobing of Christ (El Espolio) (1577–1579, oil on canvas, 285 × 173 cm, Sacristy of the Cathedral, Toledo) is one of the most famous altarpieces of El Greco. El Greco's altarpieces are renowned for their dynamic compositions and startling innovations.

El Greco made Toledo his home. Surviving contracts mention him as the tenant from 1585 onwards of a complex consisting of three apartments and twenty-four rooms which belonged to the Marquis de Villena. It was in these apartments, which also served as his workshop, that he spent the rest of his life, painting and studying. He lived in considerable style, sometimes employing musicians to play whilst he dined. It is not confirmed whether he lived with his Spanish female companion, Jerónima de Las Cuevas, whom he probably never married. She was the mother of his only son, Jorge Manuel, born in 1578, who also became a painter, assisted his father, and continued to repeat his compositions for many years after he inherited the studio. (Note: Doña Jerónima de Las Cuevas appears to have outlived El Greco, and, although the master acknowledged both her and his son, he never married her. That fact has puzzled researchers, because he mentioned her in various documents, including his last testament. Most analysts assume that El Greco had married unhappily in his youth and therefore could not legalize another attachment.) In 1604, Jorge Manuel and Alfonsa de los Morales gave birth to El Greco's grandson, Gabriel, who was baptized by Gregorio Angulo, governor of Toledo and a personal friend of the artist.

During the course of the execution of a commission for the Hospital de Tavera, El Greco fell seriously ill, and died a month later, on 7 April 1614. A few days earlier, on 31 March, he had directed that his son should have the power to make his will. Two Greeks, friends of the painter, witnessed this last will and testament (El Greco never lost touch with his Greek origins). He was buried in the Church of Santo Domingo el Antiguo, aged 72.

== Art ==
=== Technique and style ===
The primacy of imagination and intuition over the subjective character of creation was a fundamental principle of El Greco's style. El Greco discarded classicist criteria such as measure and proportion. He believed that grace is the supreme quest of art, but the painter achieves grace only by managing to solve the most complex problems with ease.

El Greco regarded color as the most important and the most ungovernable element of painting, and declared that color had primacy over form. Francisco Pacheco, a painter and theoretician who visited El Greco in 1611, wrote that the painter liked "the colors crude and unmixed in great blots as a boastful display of his dexterity" and that "he believed in constant repainting and retouching in order to make the broad masses tell flat as in nature".

"I hold the imitation of color to be the greatest difficulty of art."

— El Greco, from notes of the painter in one of his commentaries.

Art historian Max Dvořák was the first scholar to connect El Greco's art with Mannerism and Antinaturalism. Modern scholars characterize El Greco's theory as "typically Mannerist" and pinpoint its sources in the Neoplatonism of the Renaissance. Jonathan Brown believes that El Greco created a sophisticated form of art; according to Nicholas Penny "once in Spain, El Greco was able to create a style of his own—one that disavowed most of the descriptive ambitions of painting".

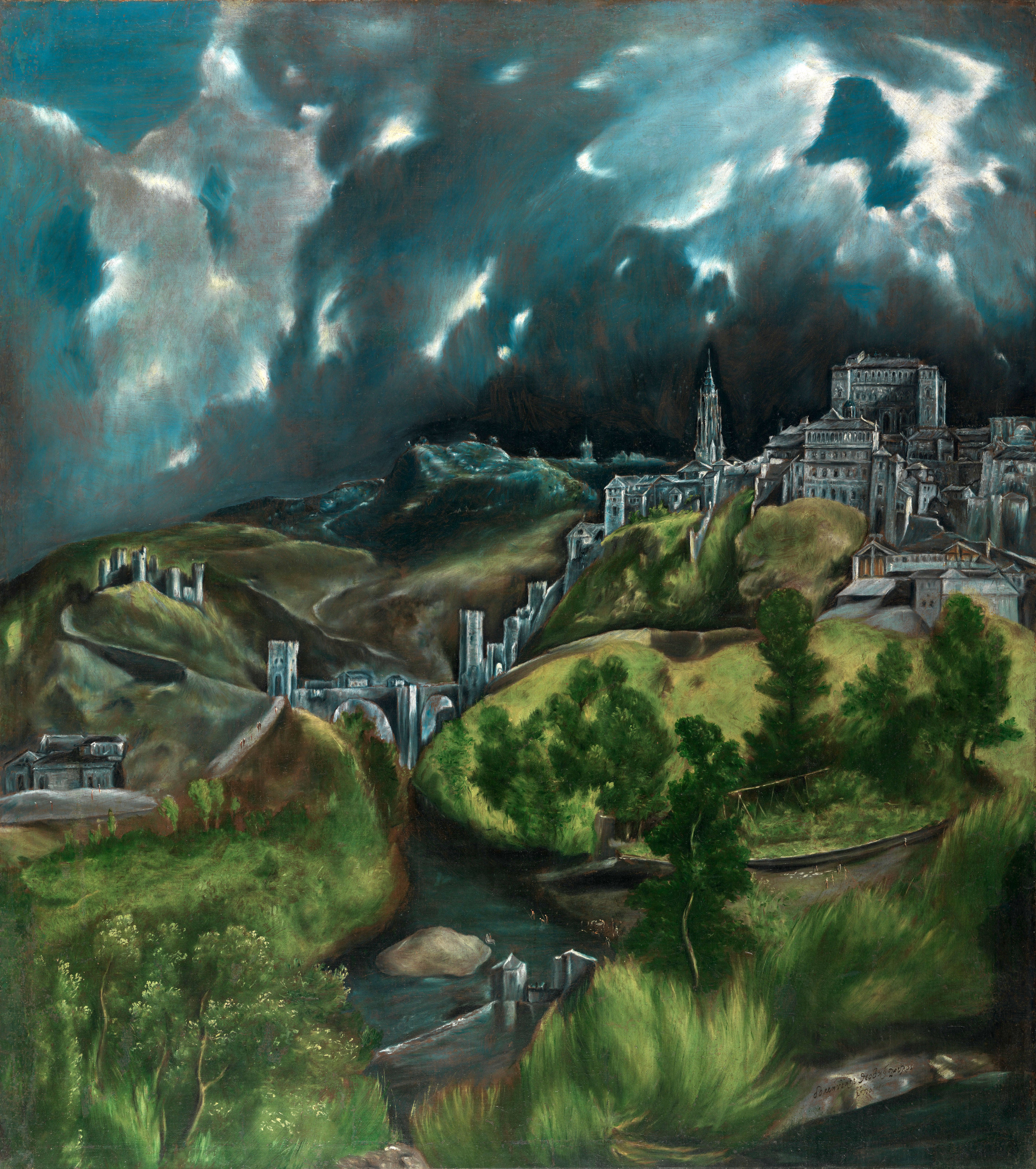
View of Toledo (c. 1596–1600, oil on canvas, 47.75 × 42.75 cm, Metropolitan Museum of Art, New York) is one of the two surviving landscapes of Toledo painted by El Greco.

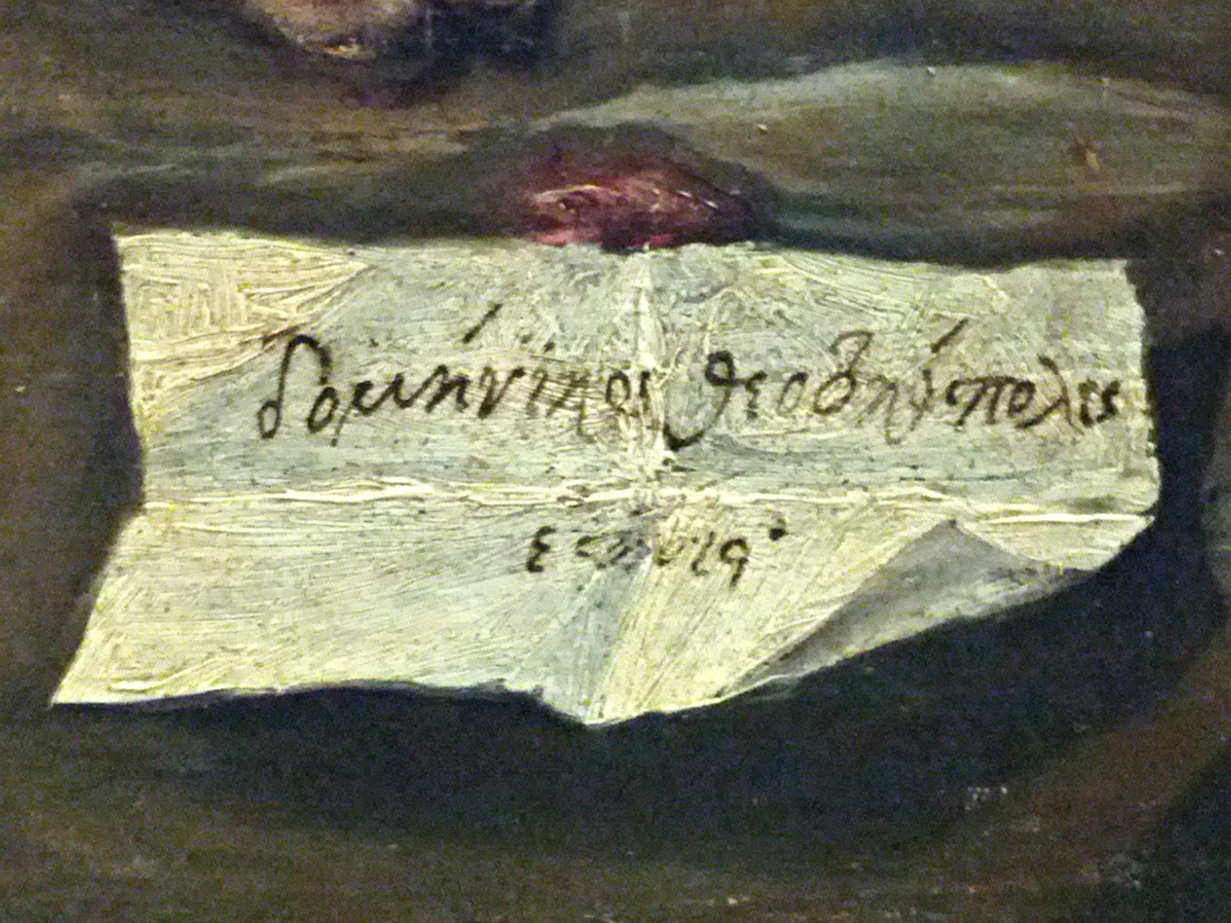
Detail from St. Andrew and St. Francis (1595, oil on canvas, Museo del Prado, Madrid), showing the artist's signature in Greek.

In his mature works El Greco demonstrated a characteristic tendency to dramatize rather than to describe. The strong spiritual emotion transfers from painting directly to the audience. According to Pacheco, El Greco's perturbed, violent and at times seemingly careless-in-execution art was due to a studied effort to acquire a freedom of style. El Greco's preference for exceptionally tall and slender figures and elongated compositions, which served both his expressive purposes and aesthetic principles, led him to disregard the laws of nature and elongate his compositions to ever greater extents, particularly when they were destined for altarpieces. The anatomy of the human body becomes even more otherworldly in El Greco's mature works; for The Immaculate Conception (El Greco, Toledo) El Greco asked to lengthen the altarpiece itself by another 1.5 ft (0.46 m) "because in this way the form will be perfect and not reduced, which is the worst thing that can happen to a figure". A significant innovation of El Greco's mature works is the interweaving between form and space; a reciprocal relationship is developed between the two which completely unifies the painting surface. This interweaving would re-emerge three centuries later in the works of Cézanne and Picasso.

Another characteristic of El Greco's mature style is the use of light. As Jonathan Brown notes, "each figure seems to carry its own light within or reflects the light that emanates from an unseen source". Fernando Marias and Agustín Bustamante García, the scholars who transcribed El Greco's handwritten notes, connect the power that the painter gives to light with the ideas underlying Christian Neo-Platonism.

Modern scholarly research emphasizes the importance of Toledo for the complete development of El Greco's mature style and stresses the painter's ability to adjust his style in accordance with his surroundings. Harold Wethey asserts that "although Greek by descent and Italian by artistic preparation, the artist became so immersed in the religious environment of Spain that he became the most vital visual representative of Spanish mysticism". He believes that in El Greco's mature works "the devotional intensity of mood reflects the religious spirit of Roman Catholic Spain in the period of the Counter-Reformation".

El Greco also excelled as a portraitist, able not only to record a sitter's features but also to convey their character. His portraits are fewer in number than his religious paintings, but are of equally high quality. Wethey says that "by such simple means, the artist created a memorable characterization that places him in the highest rank as a portraitist, along with Titian and Rembrandt".

=== Painting materials ===
El Greco painted many of his paintings on fine canvas and employed a viscous oil medium. He painted with the usual pigments of his period such as azurite, lead-tin-yellow, vermilion, madder lake, ochres and red lead, but he seldom used the expensive natural ultramarine.

=== Suggested Byzantine affinities ===
Since the beginning of the 20th century, scholars have debated whether El Greco's style had Byzantine origins. Certain art historians had asserted that El Greco's roots were firmly in the Byzantine tradition, and that his most individual characteristics derive directly from the art of his ancestors, while others had argued that Byzantine art could not be related to El Greco's later work.

"I would not be happy to see a beautiful, well-proportioned woman, no matter from which point of view, however extravagant, not only lose her beauty in order to, I would say, increase in size according to the law of vision, but no longer appear beautiful, and, in fact, become monstrous."

— El Greco, from marginalia the painter inscribed in his copy of Daniele Barbaro's translation of Vitruvius' De architectura.

The discovery of the Dormition of the Virgin on Syros, an authentic and signed work from the painter's Cretan period, and the extensive archival research in the early 1960s, contributed to the rekindling and reassessment of these theories. Although following many conventions of the Byzantine icon, aspects of the style certainly show Venetian influence, and the composition, showing the death of Mary, combines the different doctrines of the Orthodox Dormition of the Virgin and the Catholic Assumption of the Virgin. Significant scholarly works of the second half of the 20th century devoted to El Greco reappraise many of the interpretations of his work, including his supposed Byzantinism. Based on the notes written in El Greco's own hand, on his unique style, and on the fact that El Greco signed his name in Greek characters, they see an organic continuity between Byzantine painting and his art. According to Marina Lambraki-Plaka "far from the influence of Italy, in a neutral place which was intellectually similar to his birthplace, Candia, the Byzantine elements of his education emerged and played a catalytic role in the new conception of the image which is presented to us in his mature work". In making this judgement, Lambraki-Plaka disagrees with Oxford University professors Cyril Mango and Elizabeth Jeffreys, who assert that "despite claims to the contrary, the only Byzantine element of his famous paintings was his signature in Greek lettering". Nikos Hadjinikolaou states that from 1570 El Greco's painting is "neither Byzantine nor post-Byzantine but Western European. The works he produced in Italy belong to the history of the Italian art, and those he produced in Spain to the history of Spanish art".

The English art historian David Davies seeks the roots of El Greco's style in the intellectual sources of his Greek-Christian education and in the world of his recollections from the liturgical and ceremonial aspect of the Orthodox Church. Davies believes that the religious climate of the Counter-Reformation and the aesthetics of Mannerism acted as catalysts to activate his individual technique. He asserts that the philosophies of Platonism and ancient Neo-Platonism, the works of Plotinus and Pseudo-Dionysius the Areopagite, the texts of the Church fathers and the liturgy offer the keys to the understanding of El Greco's style. Summarizing the ensuing scholarly debate on this issue, José Álvarez Lopera, curator at the Museo del Prado, Madrid, concludes that the presence of "Byzantine memories" is obvious in El Greco's mature works, though there are still some obscure issues concerning his Byzantine origins needing further illumination.

=== Architecture and sculpture ===
El Greco was highly esteemed as an architect and sculptor during his lifetime. He usually designed complete altar compositions, working as architect and sculptor as well as painter—at, for instance, the Hospital de la Caridad. There he decorated the chapel of the hospital, but the wooden altar and the sculptures he created have in all probability perished. For El Espolio the master designed the original altar of gilded wood which has been destroyed, but his small sculptured group of the Miracle of St. Ildefonso still survives on the lower center of the frame.

His most important architectural achievement was the church and Monastery of Santo Domingo el Antiguo, for which he also executed sculptures and paintings. El Greco is regarded as a painter who incorporated architecture in his painting. He is also credited with the architectural frames to his own paintings in Toledo. Pacheco characterized him as "a writer of painting, sculpture and architecture".

In the marginalia that El Greco inscribed in his copy of Daniele Barbaro's translation of Vitruvius' De architectura, he refuted Vitruvius' attachment to archaeological remains, canonical proportions, perspective and mathematics. He also saw Vitruvius' manner of distorting proportions in order to compensate for distance from the eye as responsible for creating monstrous forms. El Greco was averse to the very idea of rules in architecture; he believed above all in the freedom of invention and defended novelty, variety, and complexity. These ideas were, however, far too extreme for the architectural circles of his era and had no immediate resonance.

== Legacy ==
=== Posthumous critical reputation ===
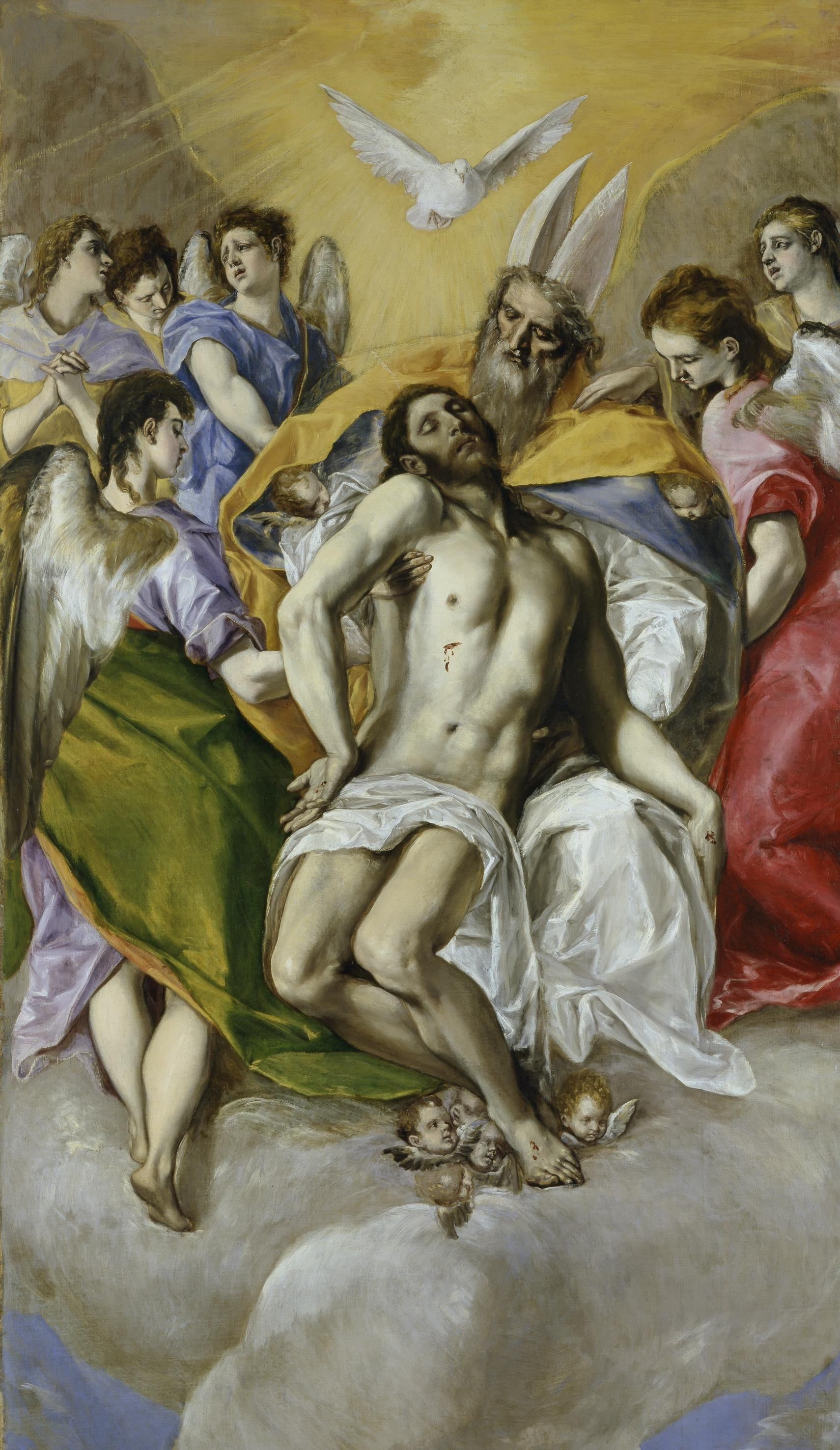
The Holy Trinity (1577–1579, 300 × 178 cm, oil on canvas, Museo del Prado, Madrid, Spain) was part of a group of works created for the church "Santo Domingo el Antiguo".

==== Contemporary ====
El Greco was disdained by the immediate generations after his death because his work was opposed in many respects to the principles of the early baroque style which came to the fore near the beginning of the 17th century and soon supplanted the last surviving traits of the 16th-century Mannerism. El Greco was deemed incomprehensible and had no important followers. Only his son and a few unknown painters produced weak copies of his works. Late 17th- and early 18th-century Spanish commentators praised his skill but criticized his antinaturalistic style and his complex iconography. Some of these commentators, such as Antonio Palomino and Juan Agustín Ceán Bermúdez, described his mature work as "contemptible", "ridiculous" and "worthy of scorn". The views of Palomino and Bermúdez were frequently repeated in Spanish historiography, adorned with terms such as "strange", "queer", "original", "eccentric" and "odd". The phrase "sunk in eccentricity", often encountered in such texts, in time developed into "madness".

Still, his paintings influenced Diego Velazquez, as well as Francisco Goya, the former positioning the main characters of his paintings in the same manner as El Greco, and painting the folds in the clothes in a similar fashion. Hortensio Félix Paravicino, one of El Greco's admirers, called his genius as being greater than that of Apelles.

==== Modern ====
With the arrival of Romantic sentiments in the late 18th century, El Greco's works were examined anew. To French writer Théophile Gautier, El Greco was the precursor of the European Romantic movement in all its craving for the strange and the extreme. Gautier regarded El Greco as the ideal romantic hero (the "gifted", the "misunderstood", the "mad"), (Note: The myth of El Greco's madness came in two versions. On the one hand Gautier believed that El Greco went mad from excessive artistic sensitivity. On the other hand, the public and the critics would not possess the ideological criteria of Gautier and would retain the image of El Greco as a "mad painter" and, therefore, his "maddest" paintings were not admired but considered to be historical documents proving his "madness".) and was the first who explicitly expressed his admiration for El Greco's later technique. French art critics Zacharie Astruc and Paul Lefort helped to promote a widespread revival of interest in his painting. Lefort particularly extolled El Greco, along with Velasquez, as one of the founders of the Spanish School which was mainly branded by its realism.

In the 1890s, Spanish painters living in Paris adopted him as their guide and mentor. However, in the popular English-speaking imagination he remained the man who "painted horrors in the Escorial" in the words of Ephraim Chambers' Cyclopaedia in 1899.

In 1908, Spanish art historian Manuel Bartolomé Cossío published the first comprehensive catalogue of El Greco's works; in this book El Greco was presented as the founder of the Spanish School. The same year Julius Meier-Graefe, a scholar of French Impressionism, traveled in Spain, expecting to study Velázquez, but instead becoming fascinated by El Greco; he recorded in 1910 his experiences in Spanische Reise (Spanish Journey, published in English in 1926), the book which widely established El Greco as a great painter of the past "outside a somewhat narrow circle". In El Greco's work, Meier-Graefe found foreshadowing of modernity. These are the words Meier-Graefe used to describe El Greco's impact on the artistic movements of his time:

He [El Greco] has discovered a realm of new possibilities. Not even he, himself, was able to exhaust them. All the generations that follow after him live in his realm. There is a greater difference between him and Titian, his master, than between him and Renoir or Cézanne. Nevertheless, Renoir and Cézanne are masters of impeccable originality because it is not possible to avail yourself of El Greco's language, if in using it, it is not invented again and again, by the user.

— Julius Meier-Graefe, The Spanish Journey

To the English artist and critic Roger Fry in 1920, El Greco was the archetypal genius who did as he thought best "with complete indifference to what effect the right expression might have on the public". Fry described El Greco as "an old master who is not merely modern, but actually appears a good many steps ahead of us, turning back to show us the way". In the 1890s, French painter Henri Rouart called him "incomparable" and "the most beautiful of all". Painter Mary Cassatt wrote in 1903 that El Greco "was two centuries ahead of his time; that is why painters, Manet among them, thought so much of him". French novelist Maurice Barrès wrote in 1912 that El Greco was "a great man, an inconceivably great genius", defending him with such ardor that it even led him to disparage Velázquez.

A 1914 Literary Digest article noted, El Greco was "ranked by some critics not only as Spain's greatest artist, but as one of the five or six greatest painters of all time". According to American artist William Alexander Griffith, in 1925, El Greco was everywhere regarded as one of the greatest artists of all time, having achieved the high honor of a classification and is called the "supreme example of the baroque in painting". British art critics Robert Byron and David Talbot Rice wrote in 1928 how El Greco might end up being as highly regarded as Raphael in the future. In 1930, Spanish art historian and architect José Pijoán wrote that El Greco was "greatest master that Spain and the world have had" and considered him the "demigod of the advanced schools" because of his revolutionary approach to form and reality. English author William Somerset Maugham, in 1938, wrote "I do not doubt that he was one of the greatest painters that ever lived. I think The Burial of the Count of Orgaz is one of the greatest pictures in the world". Spanish art historian José Camón Aznar regarded him "the most genial painter in all history", whereas American art historian Harold Edwin Wethey saw him as "one of the half-dozen greatest painters of all time". Spanish painter Ignacio Zuloaga called El Greco "the greatest painter there ever was".

During the same period, other researchers developed alternative, more radical theories. The ophthalmologists August Goldschmidt and Germán Beritens argued that El Greco painted such elongated human figures because he had vision problems (possibly progressive astigmatism or strabismus) that made him see bodies longer than they were, and at an angle to the perpendicular; (Note: This theory enjoyed surprising popularity during the early years of the twentieth century and was opposed by the German psychologist David Kuntz. Whether or not El Greco had progressive astigmatism is still open to debate. Stuart Anstis, Professor at the University of California (Department of Psychology), concludes that "even if El Greco were astigmatic, he would have adapted to it, and his figures, whether drawn from memory or life, would have had normal proportions. His elongations were an artistic expression, not a visual symptom." According to Professor of Spanish John Armstrong Crow, "astigmatism could never give quality to a canvas, nor talent to a dunce".) the physician Arturo Perera, however, attributed this style to the use of marijuana. Michael Kimmelman, a reviewer for The New York Times, stated that "to Greeks [El Greco] became the quintessential Greek painter; to the Spanish, the quintessential Spaniard".

Epitomizing the consensus of El Greco's impact, Jimmy Carter, the 39th President of the United States, said in April 1980 that El Greco was "the most extraordinary painter that ever came along back then" and that he was "maybe three or four centuries ahead of his time". Historian Eric Storm, who sees the "rediscovery" of El Greco "as one of the most important events of its kind in art history" summarized:

Thanks to authors such as Meier-Graefe and groundbreaking modern artists like Picasso, Franz Marc, and Kandinsky, in less than fifty years El Greco was eventually proclaimed to be one of the greatest painters ever.

— Eric Storm, The Discovery of El Greco: The Nationalization of Culture Versus the Rise of Modern Art (1860-1914), p. 191

Julius Meier-Grafe, indeed, considered El Greco greater than Velázquez, believing the latter to simply be a "faint reflection" of the former. He placed El Greco as the immediate precursor to French impressionism and an innovative colorist who anticipated painters like Pierre-Auguste Renoir and Paul Cézanne.

In 2003, Japanese art historian Yasunari Kitaura noted that El Greco is considered "one of the greatest painters ever in the history of universal art". He considered his art as being firmly rooted in a "prestigious artistic genealogy" prototype, which El Greco greatly outdoes, transcends and surpasses. In 2020, art critic Sebastian Smee added that: "Without El Greco, Picasso's early Blue and Rose periods are hard to imagine".

=== Influence on other artists ===
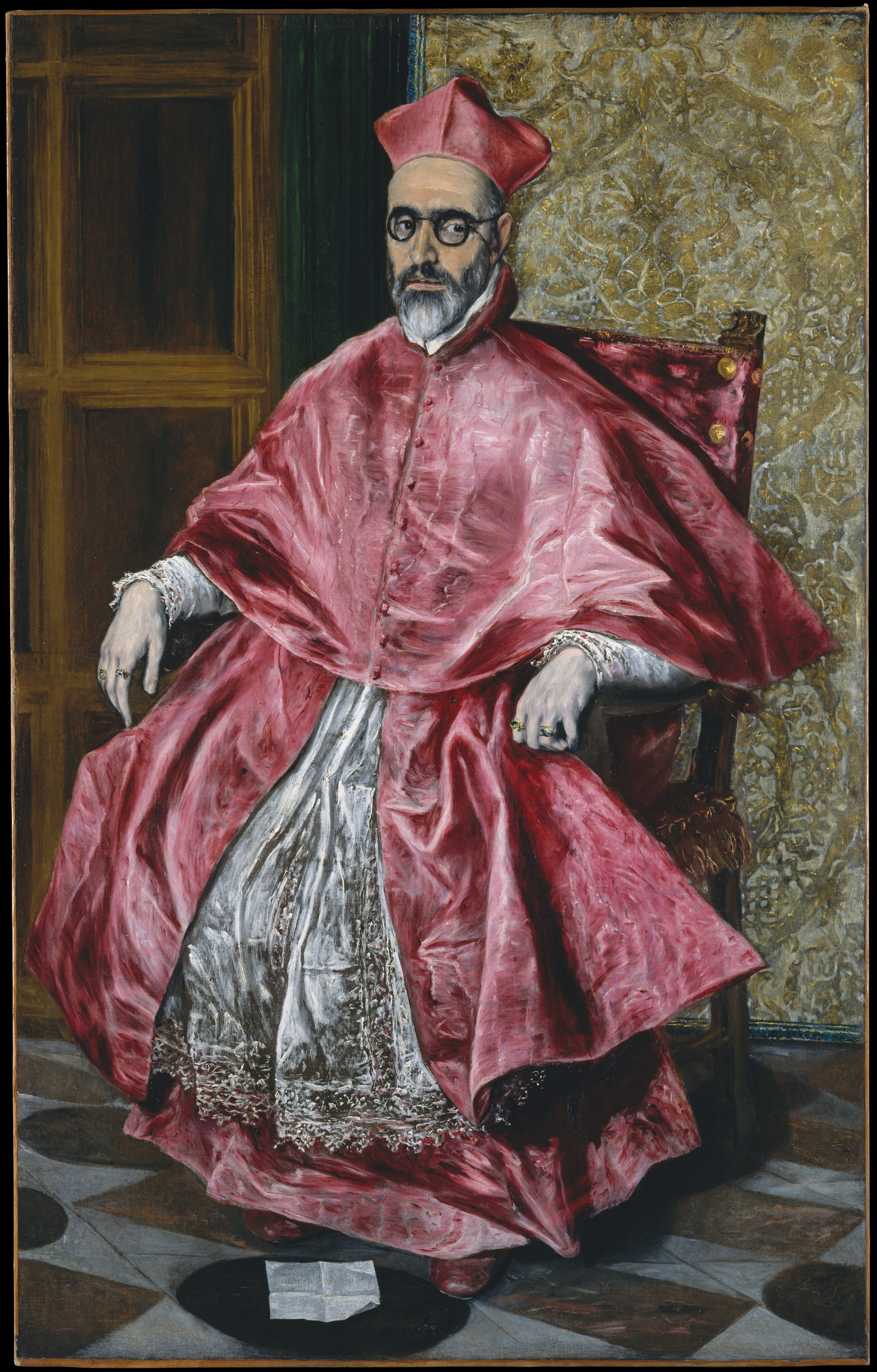
Portrait of Fernando Niño de Guevara (ca. 1600, oil on canvas, 170.8 cm × 108 cm, New York, Metropolitan Museum of Art) by El Greco is seen as the primary influence and as the "immediate predecessor" of Velázquez's famous Portrait of Innocent X.

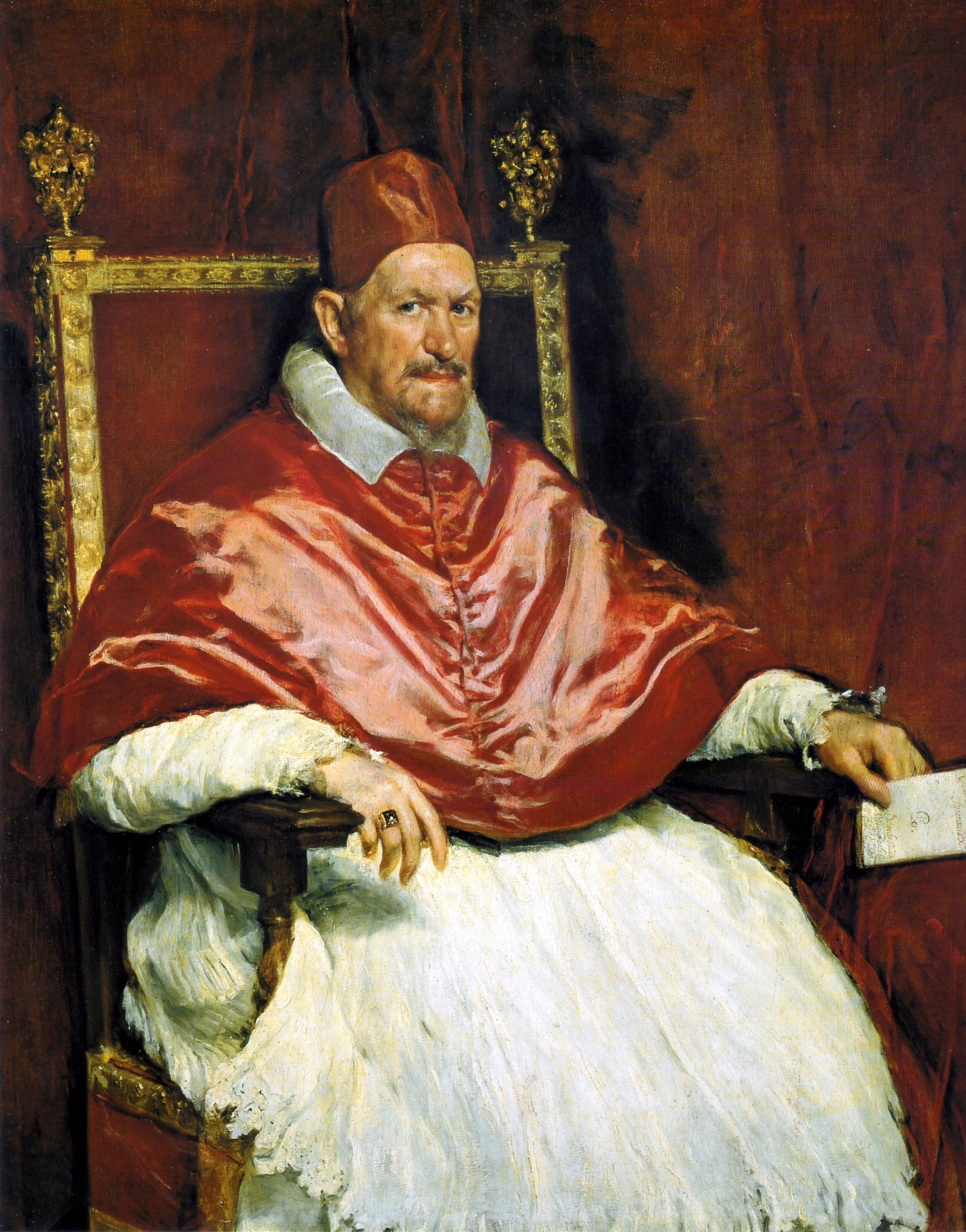
Portrait of Innocent X (ca. 1650, oil on canvas, 141 cm × 119 cm, Rome, Galleria Doria Pamphilj) by Diego Velázquez was primarily influenced by El Greco's Portrait of Fernando Niño de Guevara; the red robe of the Pope, especially, seems to have been infused with El Greco's subtlety.

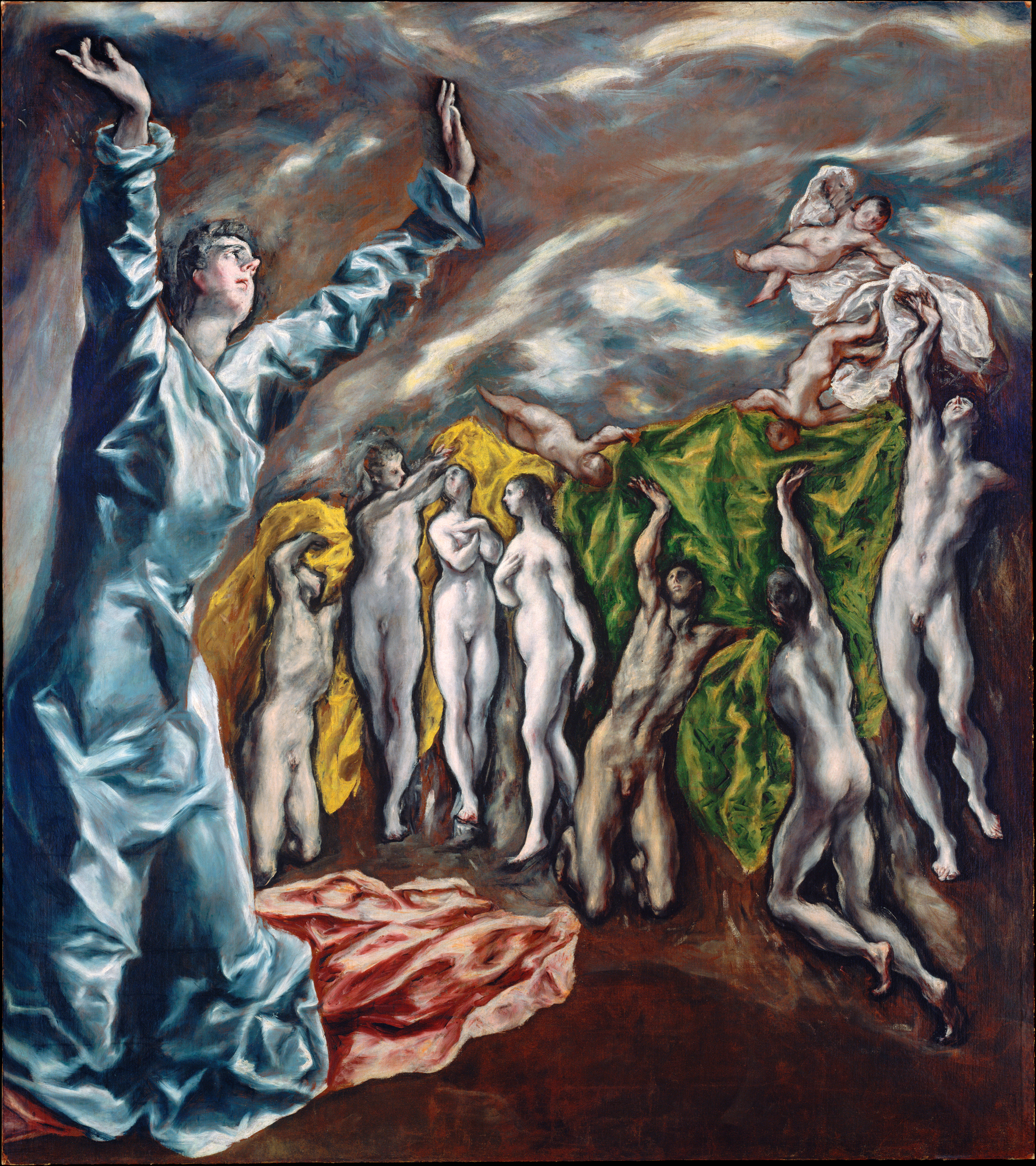
The Opening of the Fifth Seal (1608–1614, oil on canvas, 225 × 193 cm., New York, Metropolitan Museum) has been suggested to be the prime source of inspiration for Picasso's Les Demoiselles d'Avignon.

Picasso's Les Demoiselles d'Avignon (1907, oil on canvas, 243.9 × 233.7 cm., New York, Museum of Modern Art) appears to have certain morphological and stylistic similarities with The Opening of the Fifth Seal.

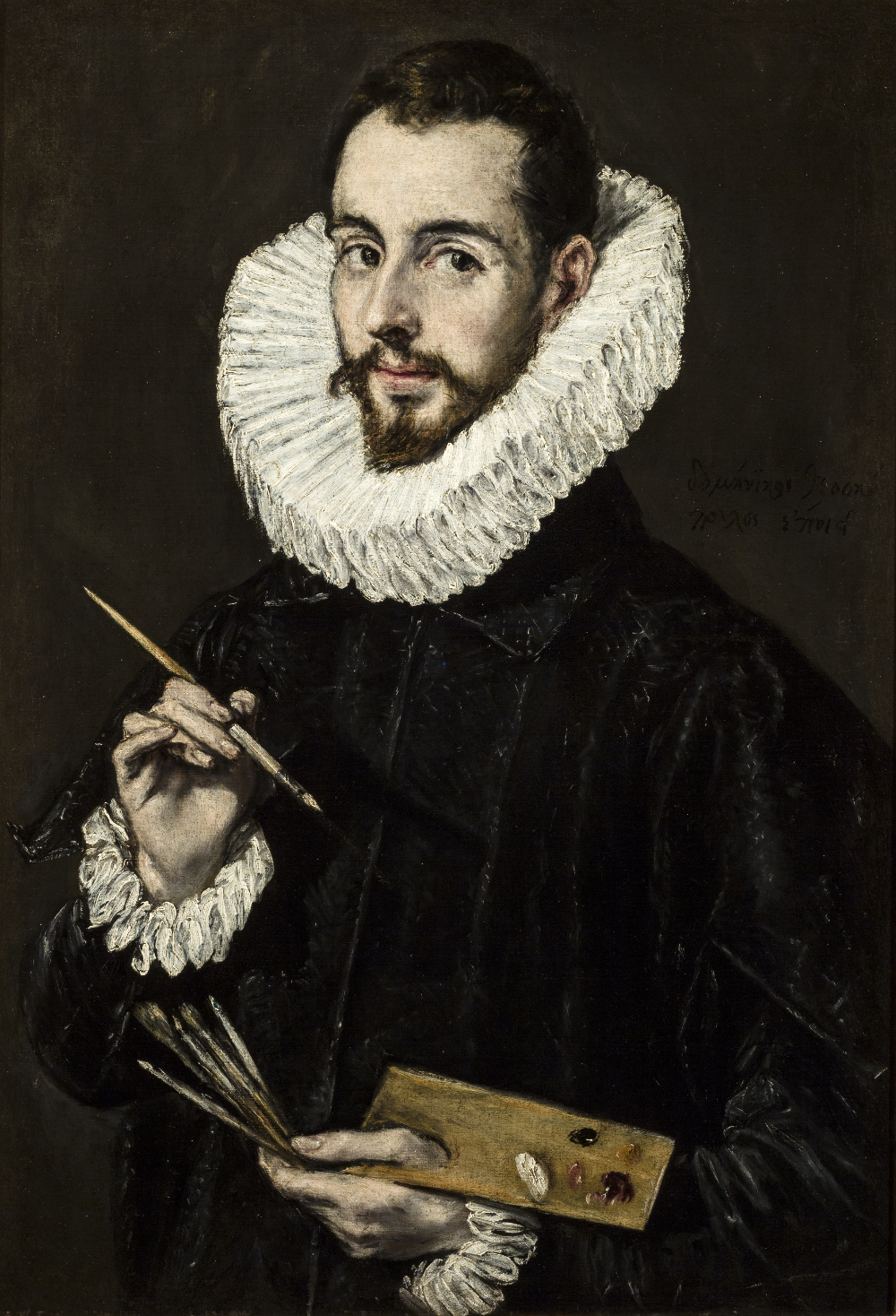
Portrait of Jorge Manuel Theotocopoulos (1600–1605, oil on canvas, 81 × 56 cm, Museo de Bellas Artes, Seville)

The Portrait of a Painter after El Greco (1950, oil on plywood, 100.5 × 81 cm, Angela Rosengart Collection, Lucerne) is Picasso's version of the Portrait of Jorge Manuel Theotocopoulos.

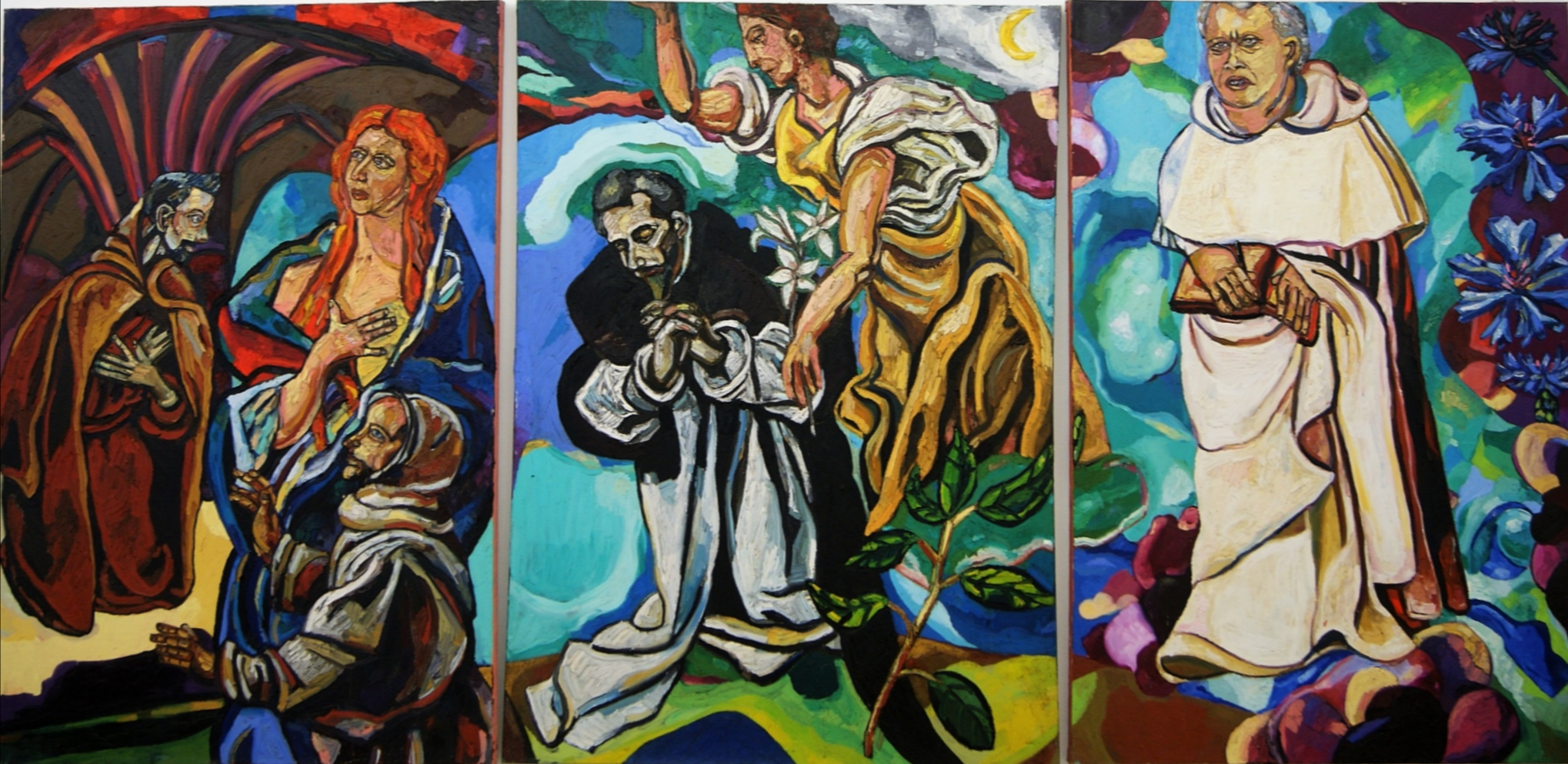
Weltenallegorie, 2009, Matthias Laurenz Gräff

Diego Velázquez was one of the earliest artists influenced by El Greco. The former positioned the main characters of his paintings in the same manner as the latter, and painted the folds in the clothes in a similar fashion. In his composition, as well as in El Greco's, there is a radiant dove at the top and swirling clouds that surround the figures. According to Charles Henry Caffin:

For Velasquez, so little disposed to be influenced by any other artist, however great, did not disdain to learn of El Greco. He occasionally borrowed from the latter's compositions, and meanwhile was permanently affected by El Greco's use of colour – his superb blacks and whites and his subtle tones of rose and blue.

— Charles Henry Caffin

Velázquez's Portrait of Innocent X, as well as his (now lost) portrait of Cardinal Borja, were also influenced by El Greco.

El Greco influenced several other Spanish painters after him, including Francisco Goya. According to art historian José Luis Morales y Marín:

El Greco's influence would be found in Goya's similar tendency to materialise the corporeal, not for itself, but as "the basis for the spiritual forces; he expressed this with identical sobriety and with the sensation of a distant being far removed from life and all it represents in the form of pleasure and sensualism.

— José Luis Morales y Marín, Goya: A Catalogue of His Paintings, p. 105

According to Efi Foundoulaki, "painters and theoreticians from the beginning of the 20th century 'discovered' a new El Greco but in process they also discovered and revealed their own selves". His expressiveness and colors influenced Eugène Delacroix and Édouard Manet. To the Blaue Reiter group in Munich in 1912, El Greco typified that mystical inner construction that it was the task of their generation to rediscover. The first painter who appears to have noticed the structural code in the morphology of the mature El Greco was Paul Cézanne, one of the forerunners of Cubism. Comparative morphological analyses of the two painters revealed their common elements, such as the distortion of the human body, the reddish and (in appearance only) unworked backgrounds and the similarities in the rendering of space. According to Brown, "Cézanne and El Greco are spiritual brothers despite the centuries which separate them". Fry observed that Cézanne drew from "his great discovery of the permeation of every part of the design with a uniform and continuous plastic theme".

The Symbolists, and Pablo Picasso during his Blue Period, drew on the cold tonality of El Greco, utilizing the anatomy of his ascetic figures. While Picasso was working on his Proto-Cubist Les Demoiselles d'Avignon, he visited his friend Ignacio Zuloaga in his studio in Paris and studied El Greco's Opening of the Fifth Seal (owned by Zuloaga since 1897). The relation between Les Demoiselles d'Avignon and the Opening of the Fifth Seal was pinpointed in the early 1980s, when the stylistic similarities and the relationship between the motifs of both works were analysed.

Salvador Dali was also influenced by El Greco. He considered him to have been one of the "Five Spanish Immortals" (alongside El Cid, Velázquez, Cervantes and Don Quixote), drawing a portrait of him in 1965. According to Dali, El Greco seemed to be "impregnated with all the savors, the substance and quintessence of the ascetic and mystical Spanish spirit" and, despite not being Spanish, "he became more Spanish than the Spaniards themselves".

The early Cubist explorations of Picasso were to uncover other aspects in the work of El Greco: structural analysis of his compositions, multi-faced refraction of form, interweaving of form and space, and special effects of highlights. Several traits of Cubism, such as distortions and the materialistic rendering of time, have their analogies in El Greco's work. According to Picasso, El Greco's structure is Cubist. On 22 February 1950, Picasso began his series of "paraphrases" of other painters' works with The Portrait of a Painter after El Greco. Foundoulaki asserts that Picasso "completed ... the process for the activation of the painterly values of El Greco which had been started by Manet and carried on by Cézanne".

The expressionists focused on the expressive distortions of El Greco. According to Franz Marc, one of the principal painters of the German expressionist movement, "we refer with pleasure and with steadfastness to the case of El Greco, because the glory of this painter is closely tied to the evolution of our new perceptions on art". Jackson Pollock, a major force in the abstract expressionist movement, was also influenced by El Greco. By 1943, Pollock had completed sixty drawing compositions after El Greco and owned three books on the Cretan master.

Pollock influenced the artist Joseph Glasco's interest in El Greco's art. Glasco created several contemporary paintings based on one of his favorite subjects, El Greco's View of Toledo.

Kysa Johnson used El Greco's paintings of the Immaculate Conception as the compositional framework for some of her works, and the master's anatomical distortions are somewhat reflected in Fritz Chesnut's portraits.

El Greco's personality and work were a source of inspiration for poet Rainer Maria Rilke. One set of Rilke's poems (Himmelfahrt Mariae I.II., 1913) was based directly on El Greco's Immaculate Conception. Greek writer Nikos Kazantzakis, who felt a great spiritual affinity for El Greco, called his autobiography Report to Greco and wrote a tribute to the Cretan-born artist.

In 1998, the Greek electronic composer and artist Vangelis published El Greco, a symphonic album inspired by the artist. This album is an expansion of an earlier album by Vangelis, Foros Timis Ston Greco (A Tribute to El Greco, Φόρος Τιμής Στον Γκρέκο). The life of the Cretan-born artist is the subject of the film El Greco of Greek, Spanish and British production. Directed by Ioannis Smaragdis, the film began shooting in October 2006 on the island of Crete and debuted on the screen one year later; British actor Nick Ashdon was cast to play El Greco.

== Debates on attribution ==
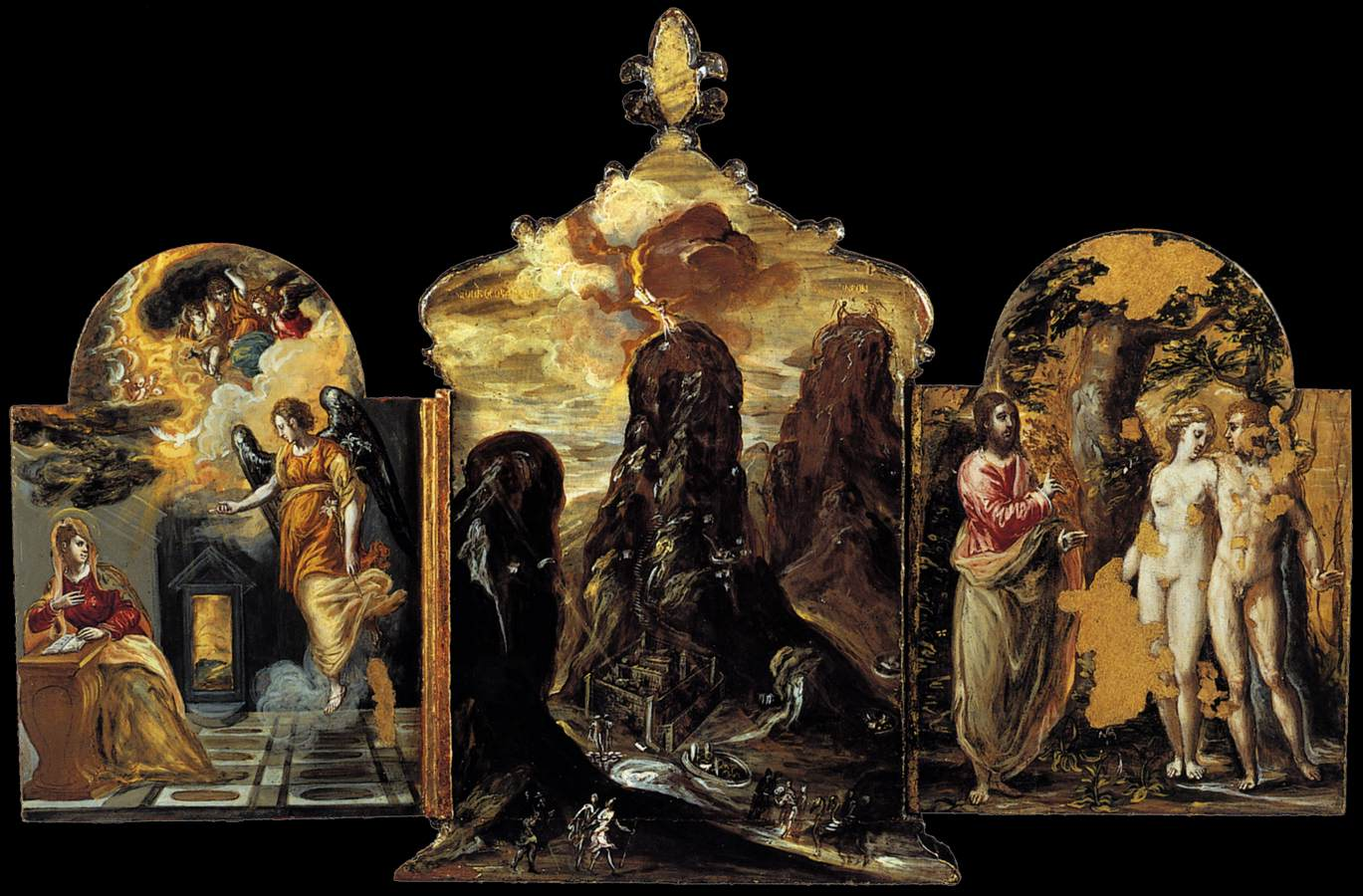
The Modena Triptych (1568, tempera on panel, 37 × 23.8 cm (central), 24 × 18 cm (side panels), Galleria Estense, Modena) is a small-scale composition attributed to El Greco.

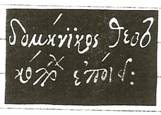
"Δομήνικος Θεοτοκόπουλος (Doménikos Theotokópoulos) ἐποίει." The words El Greco used to sign his paintings. El Greco appended after his name the word "epoiei" (ἐποίει, "(he) made it"). In The Assumption the painter used the word "deixas" (δείξας, "(he) displayed it") instead of "epoiei".

The exact number of El Greco's works has been a hotly contested issue. In 1937, a highly influential study by art historian Rodolfo Pallucchini had the effect of greatly increasing the number of works accepted to be by El Greco. Pallucchini attributed to El Greco a small triptych in the Galleria Estense at Modena on the basis of a signature on the painting on the back of the central panel on the Modena triptych ("Χείρ Δομήνιϰου", Created by the hand of Doménikos). There was consensus that the triptych was indeed an early work of El Greco and, therefore, Pallucchini's publication became the yardstick for attributions to the artist. Nevertheless, Wethey denied that the Modena triptych had any connection at all with the artist and, in 1962, produced a reactive catalogue raisonné with a greatly reduced corpus of materials. Whereas art historian José Camón Aznar had attributed between 787 and 829 paintings to the Cretan master, Wethey reduced the number to 285 authentic works and Halldor Sœhner, a German researcher of Spanish art, recognized only 137. Wethey and other scholars rejected the notion that Crete took any part in his formation and supported the elimination of a series of works from El Greco's œuvre.

Since 1962, the discovery of the Dormition and the extensive archival research has gradually convinced scholars that Wethey's assessments were not entirely correct, and that his catalogue decisions may have distorted the perception of the whole nature of El Greco's origins, development and œuvre. The discovery of the Dormition led to the attribution of three other signed works of "Doménicos" to El Greco (Modena Triptych, St. Luke Painting the Virgin and Child, and The Adoration of the Magi) and then to the acceptance of more works as authentic—some signed, some not (such as The Passion of Christ (Pietà with Angels) painted in 1566),—which were brought into the group of early works of El Greco. El Greco is now seen as an artist with a formative training on Crete; a series of works illuminate his early style, some painted while he was still on Crete, some from his period in Venice, and some from his subsequent stay in Rome. Even Wethey accepted that "he [El Greco] probably had painted the little and much disputed triptych in the Galleria Estense at Modena before he left Crete". Nevertheless, disputes over the exact number of El Greco's authentic works remain unresolved, and the status of Wethey's catalogue raisonné is at the center of these disagreements.

A few sculptures, including Epimetheus and Pandora, have been attributed to El Greco. This doubtful attribution is based on the testimony of Pacheco (he saw in El Greco's studio a series of figurines, but these may have been merely models). There are also four drawings among the surviving works of El Greco; three of them are preparatory works for the altarpiece of Santo Domingo el Antiguo and the fourth is a study for one of his paintings, The Crucifixion.

== Gallery ==
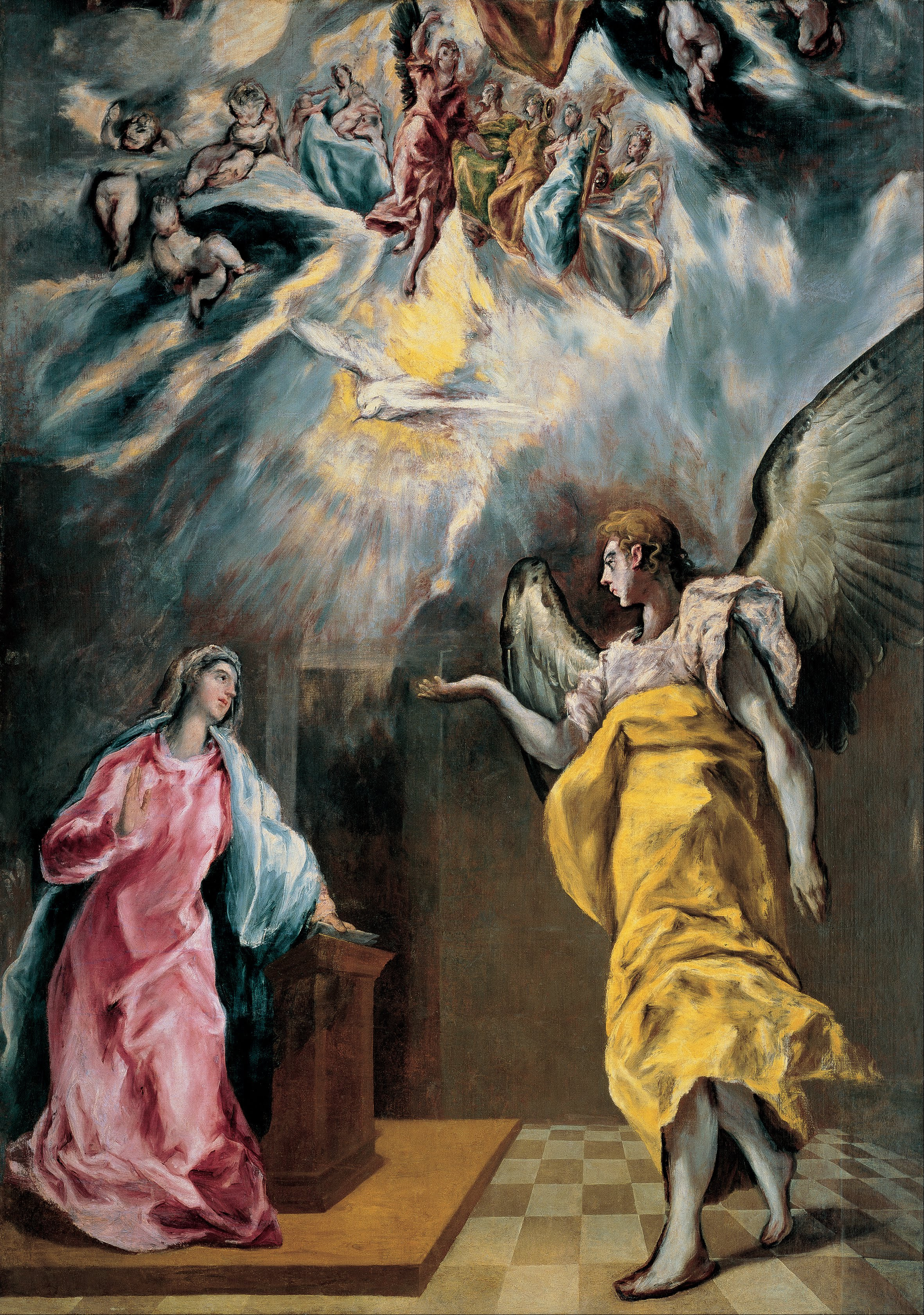
The Annunciation

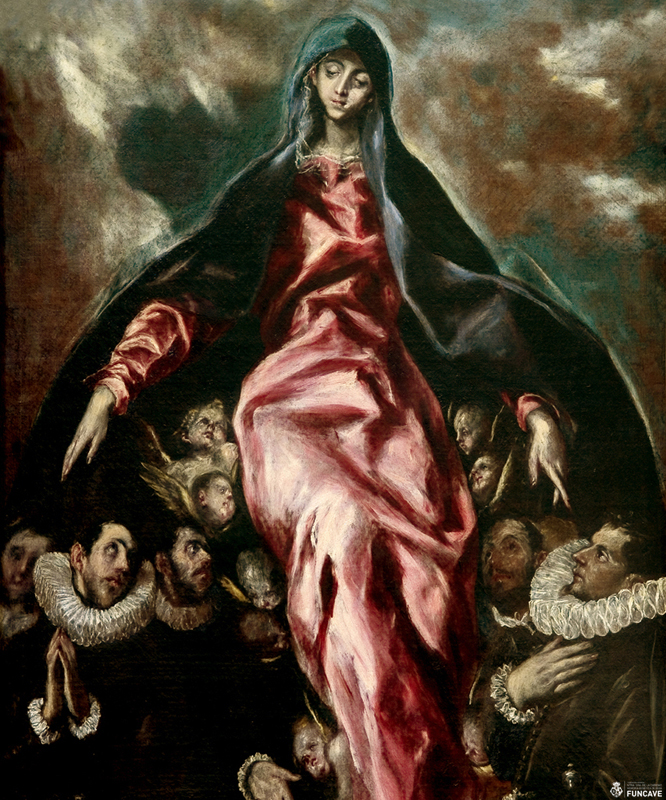
The Madonna of Charity

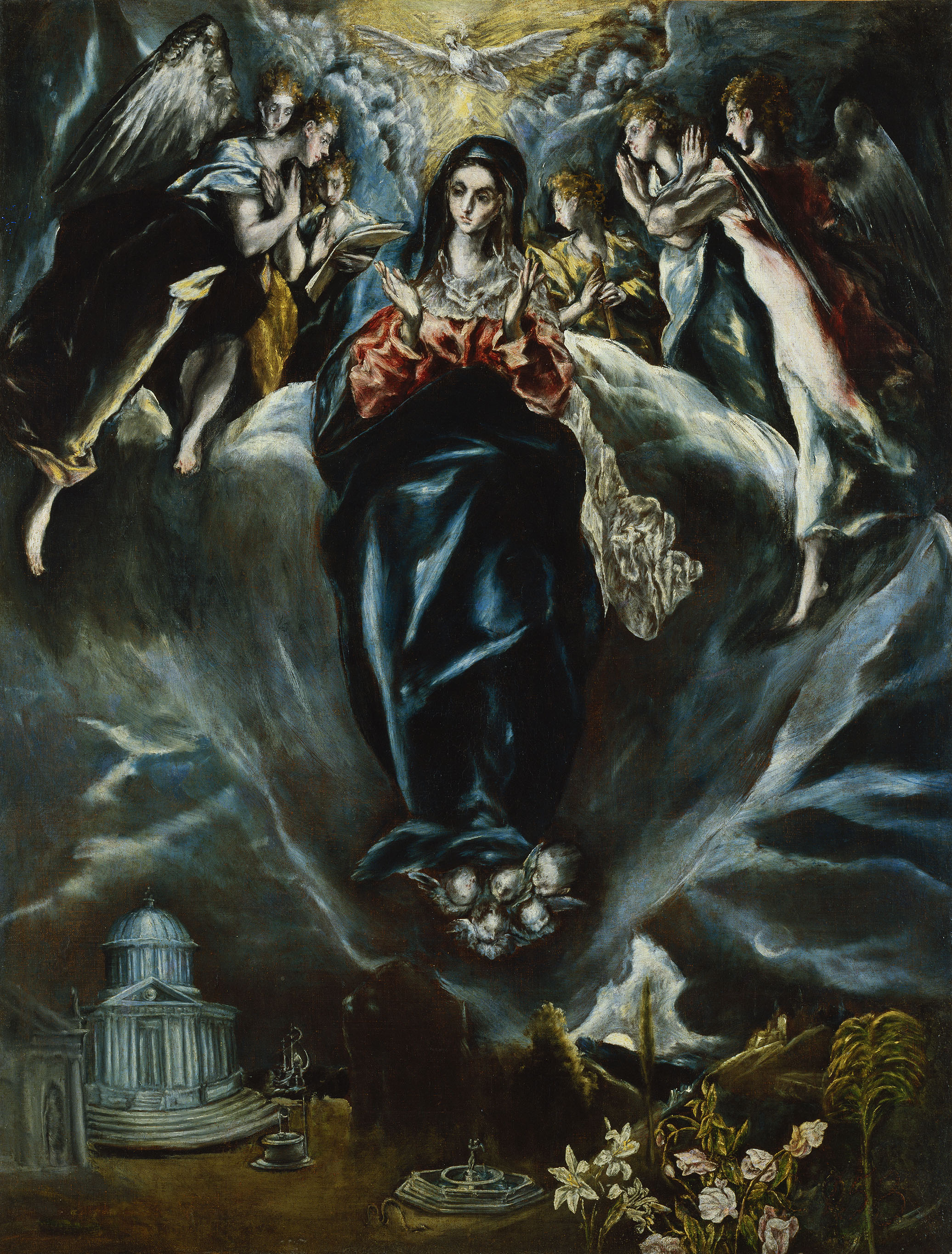
The Immaculate Conception

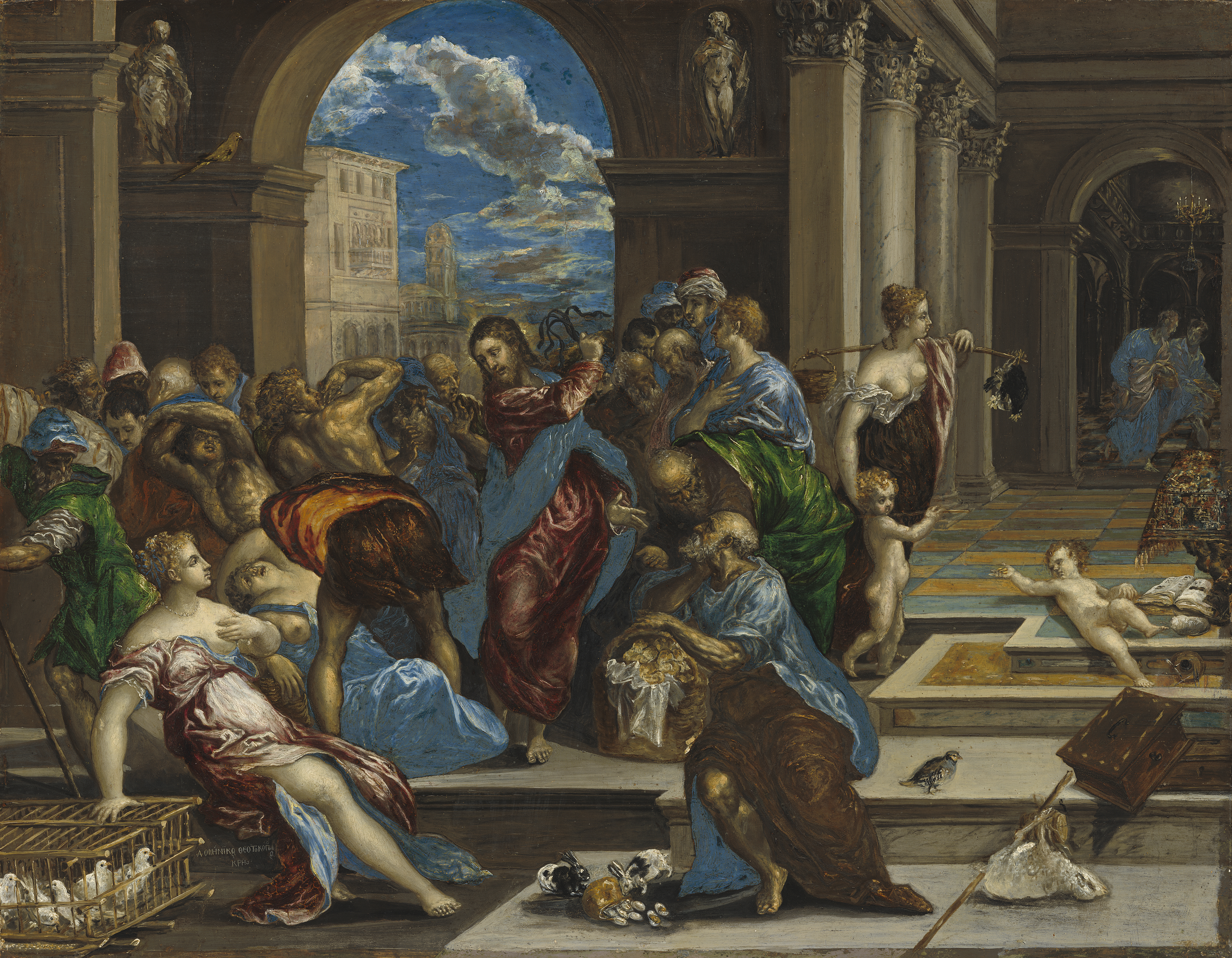
Christ Driving the Money Changers from the Temple

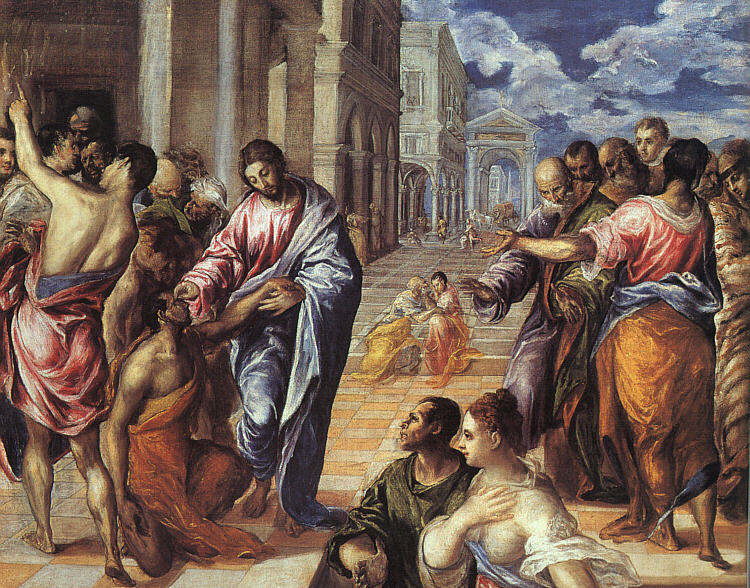
Christ Healing the Blind

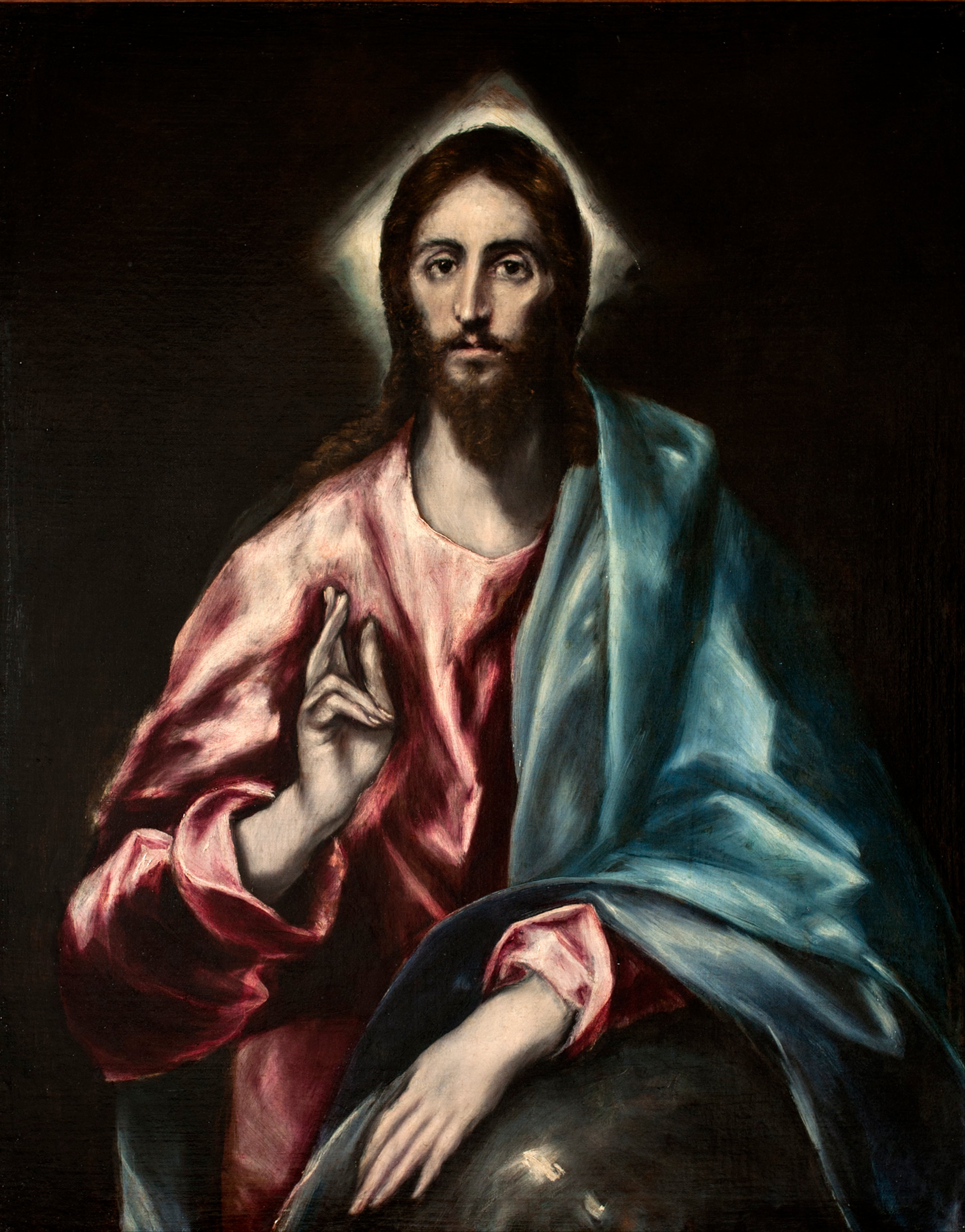
Christ as Saviour

Laocoön

The Nobleman with his Hand on his Chest

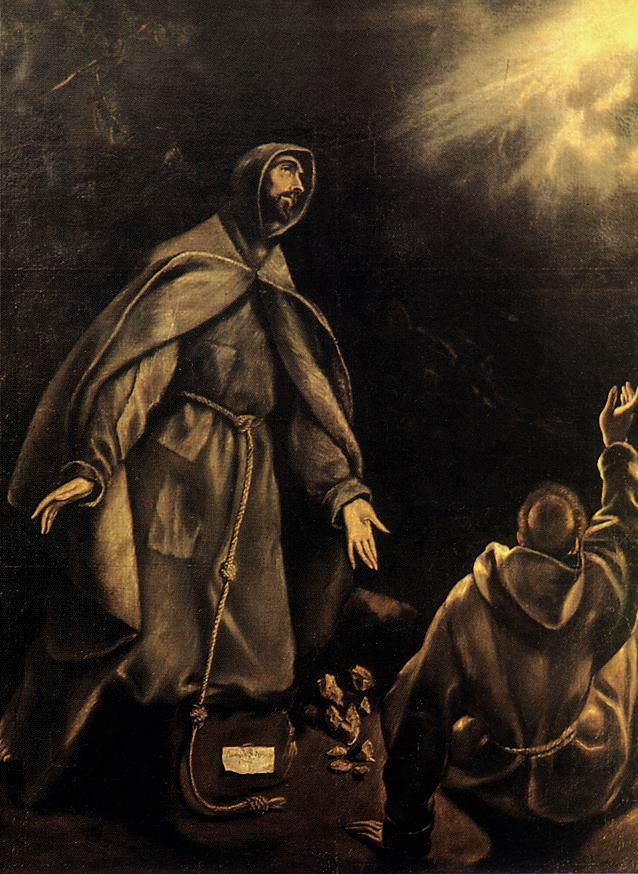
The Stigmatization of St Francis

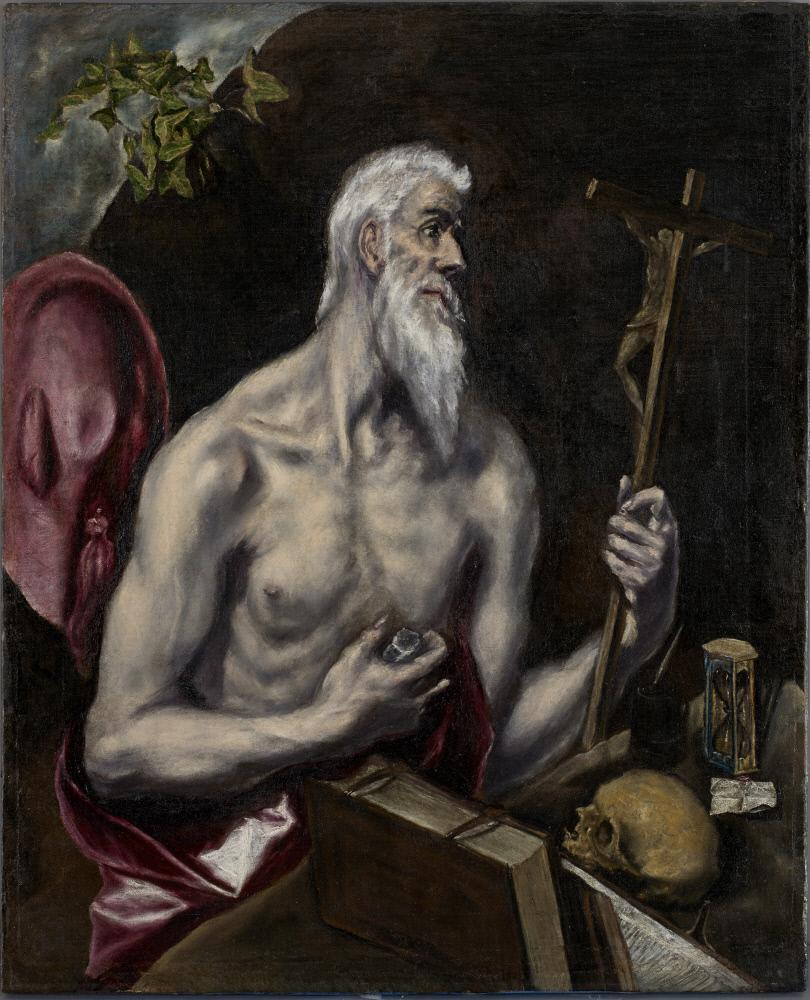
Saint Jerome

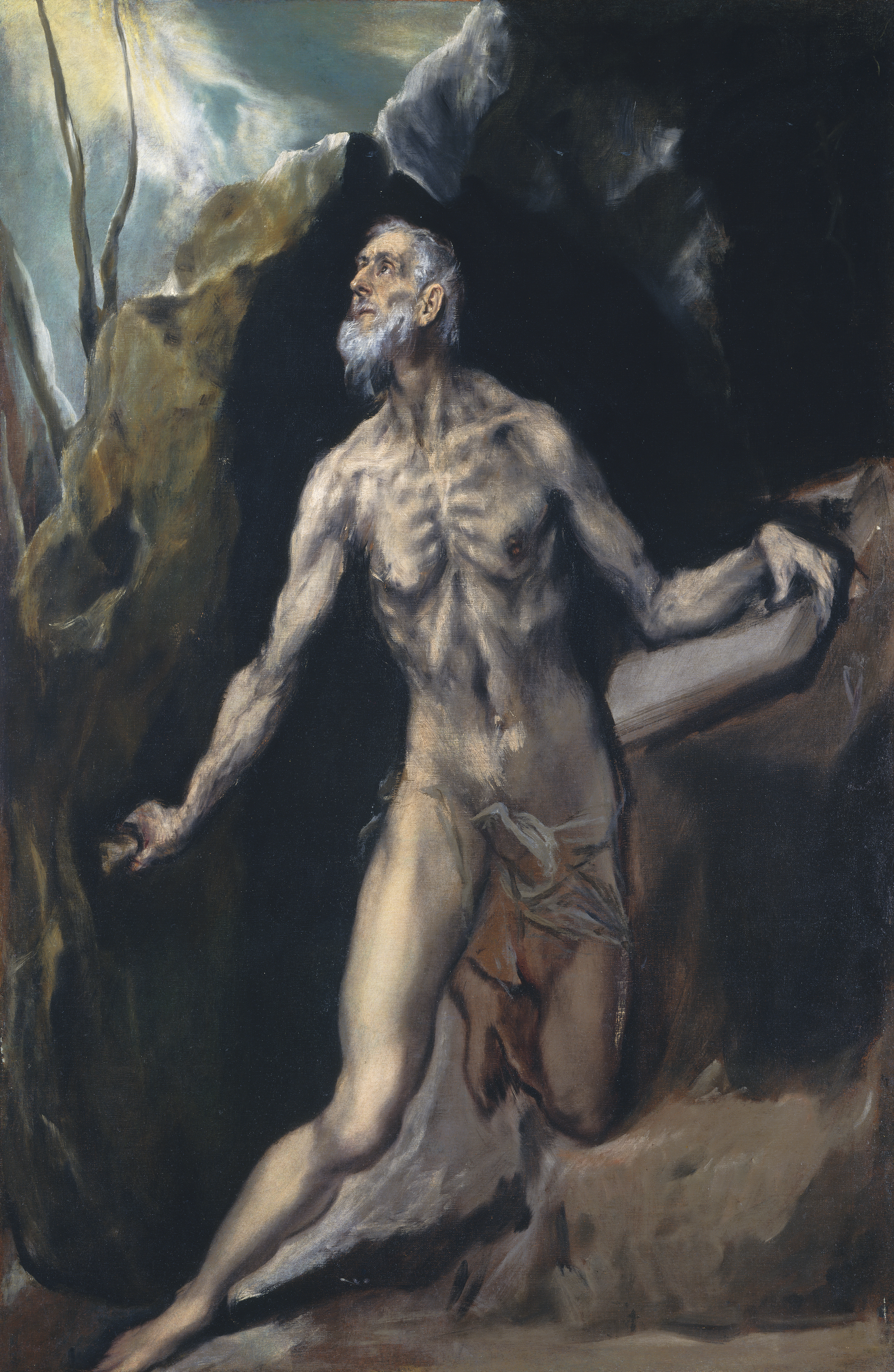
Saint Jerome

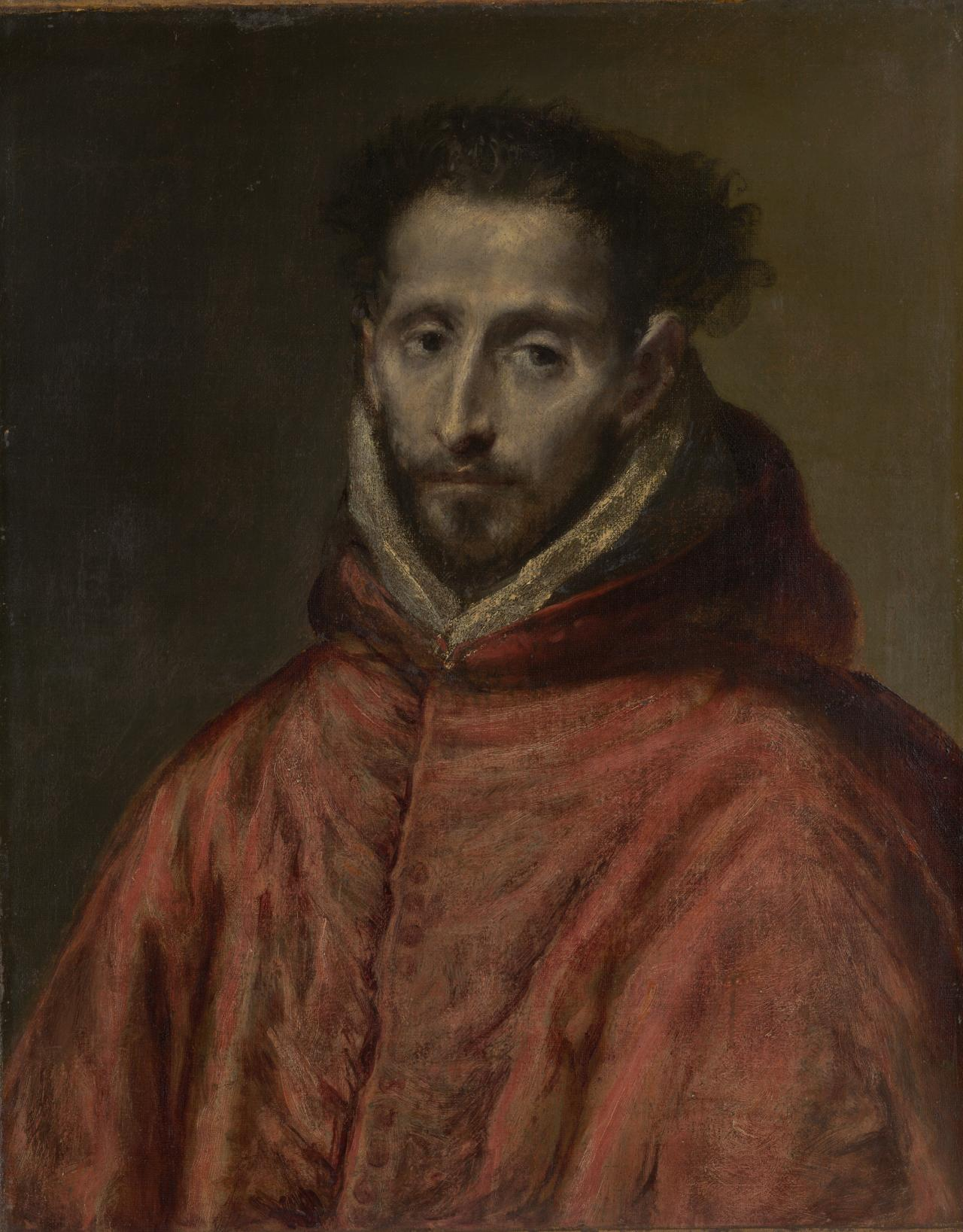
Portrait of a Cardinal

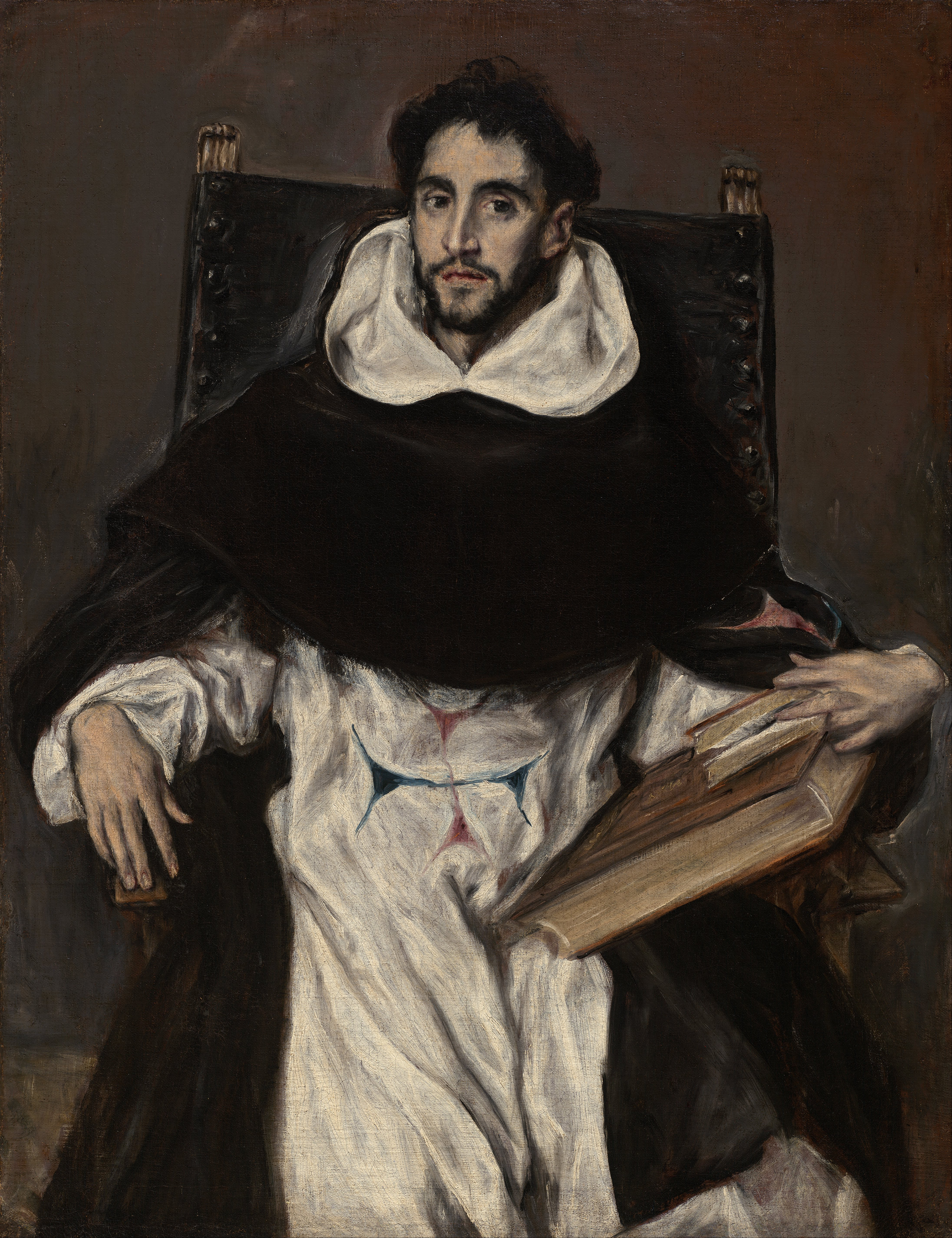
Fray Hortensio Félix Paravicino

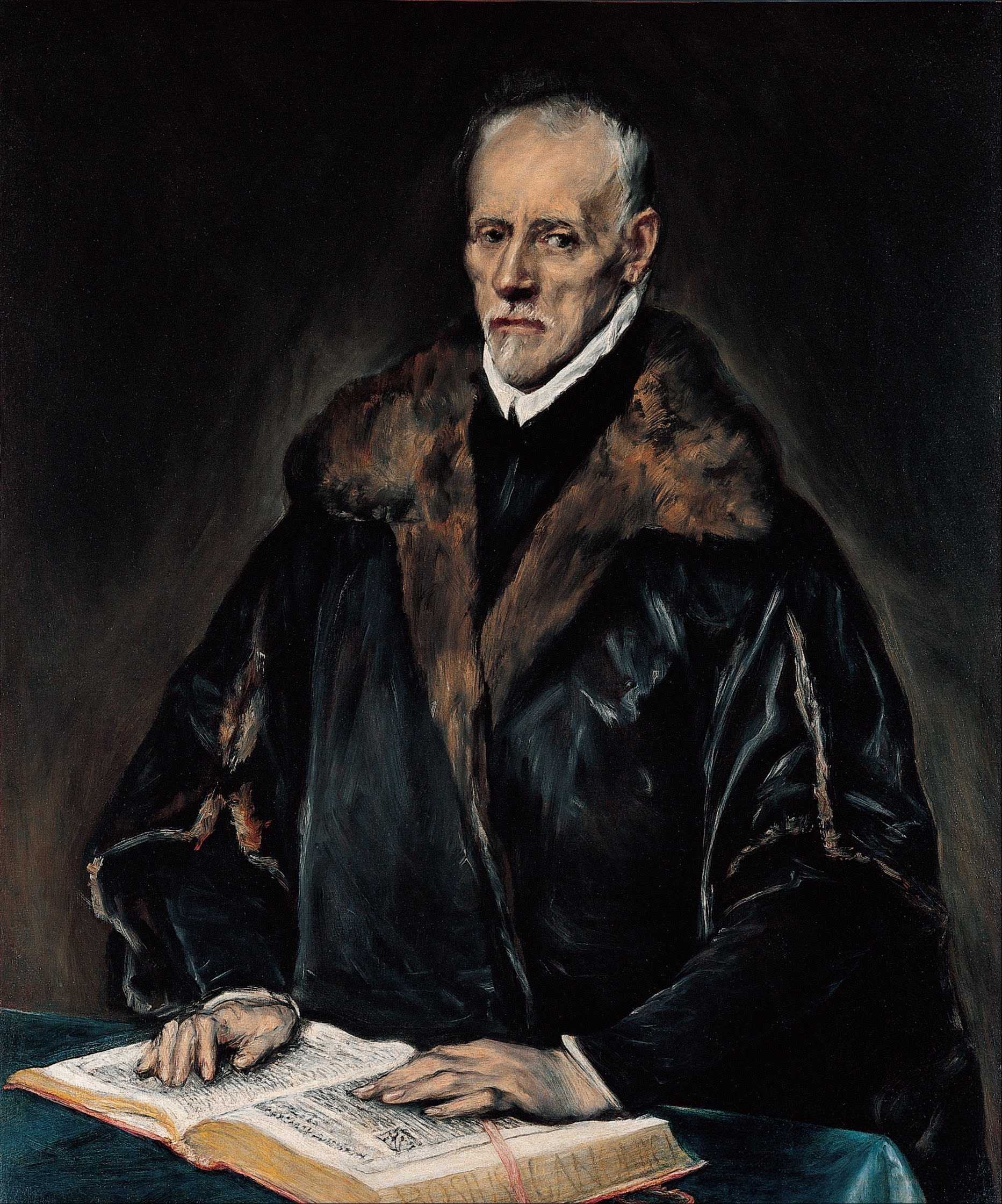
Portrait of Dr. Francisco de Pisa

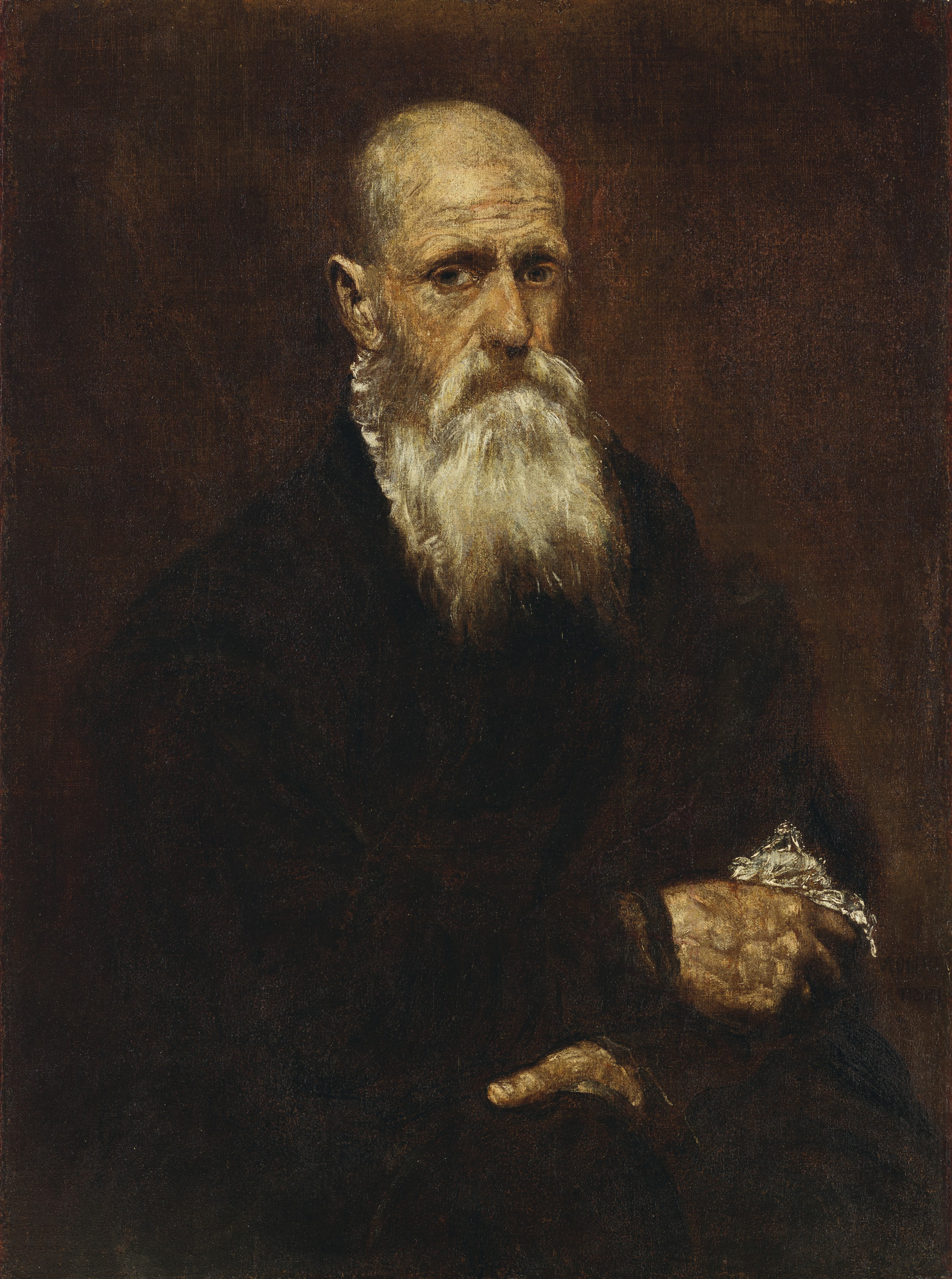
Portrait of a Bearded Man

== Nazi-looted art ==
In 2010, the heirs of the Baron Mor Lipot Herzog, a Jewish Hungarian art collector who had been looted by the Nazis, filed a restitution claim for El Greco's The Agony in the Garden. In 2015, El Greco's Portrait of a Gentleman, which had been looted by the Nazis from German Jewish art collector Julius Priester in 1944, was returned to his heirs after it surfaced at an auction with a fake provenance. According to Anne Webber, co-chair of the Commission for Looted Art in Europe, the painting's provenance had been "scrubbed".

== See also ==
- El Greco Museum, Toledo, Spain
- Museum of El Greco, Fodele, Crete

== Notes ==
Timeline of El Greco's life (1541–7 April 1614)

== Citations ==
=== References ===
==== Books and articles ====
- Acton, Mary (1991). Learning to Look at Paintings. Oxford University Press. ISBN 0-521-40107-0.
- Allardyce, Isabel (2003). "Our Lady of Charity, at Illescas". Historic Shrines of Spain 1912. Kessinger Publishing. ISBN 0-7661-3621-3.
- Álvarez Lopera, José (2005). "El Greco: From Crete to Toledo (translated in Greek by Sofia Giannetsou)". In Tazartes, M. (ed.). El Greco. Explorer. ISBN 960-7945-83-2.
- Anstis, Stuart (2002). "Was El Greco Astigmatic" (PDF). Leonardo. 35 (2): 208. doi:10.1162/00240940252940612. S2CID 57572184.
- Arslan, Edoardo (1964). "Cronisteria del Greco Madonnero". Commentari. xv (5): 213–231.
- Boubli, Lizzie (2003). "Michelangelo and Spain: on the Dissemination of his Draughtsmanship". Reactions to the Master edited by Francis Ames-Lewis and Paul Joannides. Ashgate Publishing, Ltd. ISBN 0-7546-0807-7.
- Braham, Allan (June 1966). "Two Notes on El Greco and Michelangelo". Burlington Magazine. 108 (759). The Burlington Magazine Publications, Ltd.: 307–310. JSTOR 874984.
- Bray, Xavier (2004). El Greco. National Gallery Company, London. ISBN 1-85709-315-1.
- Brown, Jonathan, ed. (1982). "El Greco and Toledo". El Greco of Toledo (catalogue). Little Brown. ASIN B000H458CY.
- Brown, Jonathan; Kagan, Richard L. (1982). "View of Toledo". Studies in the History of Art. 11: 19–30.
- Brown, Jonathan; Mann, Richard G. (1997). "Tone". Spanish Paintings of the Fifteenth Through Nineteenth Centuries. Routledge (UK). ISBN 0-415-14889-8.
- Byron, Robert (October 1929). "Greco: The Epilogue to Byzantine Culture". The Burlington Magazine for Connoisseurs. 55 (319). The Burlington Magazine Publications, Ltd.: 160–174. JSTOR 864104.
- Constantoudaki, Maria (1975–1976). "D. Theotocópoulos, from Candia to Venice (in Greek)". Bulletin of the Christian Archeological Society. 8 (period IV): 55–71.
- Cormack, Robin (1997). Painting the Soul, Icons, Death Masks and Shrouds. Reaktion Books, London.
- Cossío, Manuel Bartolomé (1908). El Greco (in Spanish). Victoriano Suárez, Madrid.
- Crow, John Armstrong (1985). "The Fine Arts – End of the Golden Age". Spain: The Root and the Flower. University of California Press. ISBN 0-520-05133-5.
- Davies, David (1990). "The Byzantine Legacy in the Art of El Greco". El Greco of Crete (proceedings) edited by Nicos Hadjinicolaou. Herakleion.
- Davies, David (1990). "The Influence of Christian Neo-Platonism on the Art of El Greco". El Greco of Crete (proceedings) edited by Nicos Hadjinicolaou. Herakleion.
- Engass Robert, Brown Jonathan (1992). "Artistic Practice – El Greco versus the Hospital of Charity, Illescas". Italian and Spanish Art, 1600–1750. Northwestern University Press. ISBN 0-8101-1065-2.
- Fernádez, Francisco de San Román (1927). "De la Vida del Greco – Nueva Serie de Documentos Inéditos". Archivo Español del Arte y Arqueologia (in Spanish). 8: 172–184.
- Firestone, Chaz (2013). "On the Origin and Status of the 'El Greco Fallacy'". Perception. 42 (6): 672–674. doi:10.1068/p7488. PMID 24422249. S2CID 46387563. Archived from the original on 17 March 2014.
- Foundoulaki, Efi (1992). "From El Greco to Cézanne". From El Greco to Cézanne (catalogue). National Gallery – Alexandros Soutsos Museum.
- Foundoulaki, Efi (24 August 1990). "Reading El Greco through Manet (in Greek)". Anti (445): 40–47.
- Gautier, Théophile (1981). "Chapitre X". Voyage en Espagne (in French). Gallimard-Jeunesse. ISBN 2-07-037295-2.
- "Greco, El". Encyclopædia Britannica. 2002.
- Grierson, Ian (2000). "Who am Eye". The Eye Book. Liverpool University Press. ISBN 0-85323-755-7.
- Griffith, William (2005). "El Greco". Great Painters and Their Famous Bible Pictures. Kessinger Publishing. ISBN 1-4179-0608-1.
- Gudiol, José (1973). Doménicos Theotocópoulos, El Greco, 1541–1614. Viking Press. ASIN B0006C8T6E.
- Gudiol, José (September 1962). "Iconography and Chronology in El Greco's Paintings of St. Francis". Art Bulletin. 44 (3). College Art Association: 195–203. doi:10.2307/3048016. JSTOR 3048016.
- Hadjinicolaou, Nicos (1990). "Doménicos Theotocópoulos, 450 Years from his Birth". El Greco of Crete (proceedings) edited by Nicos Hadjinicolaou. Herakleion.
- Hadjinicolaou, Nicos (1994). "Inequalities in the work of Theotocópoulos and the Problems of their Interpretation". Meanings of the Image edited by Nicos Hadjinicolaou (in Greek). University of Crete. ISBN 960-7309-65-0.
- Harris, Enriquetta (April 1938). "A Decorative Scheme by El Greco". The Burlington Magazine for Connoisseurs. 72 (421). The Burlington Magazine Publications, Ltd.: 154–155+157–159+162–164. JSTOR 867279.
- Helm, Robert Meredith (2001). "The Neoplatonic Tradition in the Art of El Greco". Neoplatonism and Western Aesthetics edited by Aphrodite Alexandrakis and Nicholas J. Moutafakis. SUNY Press. ISBN 0-7914-5279-4.
- Hispanic Society of America (1927). El Greco in the Collection of the Hispanic Society of America. Printed by order of the trustees.
- Johnson, Ron (October 1980). "Picasso's "Demoiselles d'Avignon" and the Theatre of the Absurd". Arts Magazine. V (2): 102–113.
- Kandinsky Wassily, Marc Franz (1987). L'Almanach du "Blaue Reiter". Klincksieck. ISBN 2-252-02567-0.
- Lambraki-Plaka, Marina (1999). El Greco-The Greek. Kastaniotis. ISBN 960-03-2544-8.
- Lambraki-Plaka, Marina (19 April 1987). "El Greco, the Puzzle. Doménicos Theotocópoulos today". To Vima.
- Lambraki-Plaka, Marina (1992). "From El Greco to Cézanne (An "Imaginary Museum" with Masterpieces of Three Centuries)". From El Greco to Cézanne (catalogue). National Gallery-Alexandros Soutsos Museum.
- Landon, A.E. (2003). Reincarnation Magazine 1925. Kessinger Publishing. ISBN 0-7661-3775-9.
- Lefaivre Liane, Tzonis Alexander (2003). "El Greco (Domenico Theotocopoulos)". El Greco – The Greek. Routledge (UK). ISBN 0-415-26025-6.
- Mango Cyril, Jeffreys Elizabeth (2002). "Towards a Franco-Greek Culture". The Oxford History of Byzantium. Oxford University Press. ISBN 0-19-814098-3.
- Mann, Richard G. (2002). "Tradition and Originality in El Greco's Work" (PDF). Journal of the Rocky Mountain. 23. The Medieval and Renaissance Association: 83–110. Archived from the original (PDF) on 6 September 2006.
- Marías, Fernando (1999). "El Greco's Artistic Thought". El Greco, Identity and Transformation edited by Álvarez Lopera. Skira. ISBN 88-8118-474-5.
- Marías Fernando, Bustamante García Agustín (1981). Las Ideas Artísticas de El Greco (in Spanish). Cátedra. ISBN 84-376-0263-7.
- Mayer, August L. (June 1929). "El Greco – An Oriental Artist". The Art Bulletin. 11 (2). College Art Association: 146–152. doi:10.2307/3045440. JSTOR 3045440.
- Mayer, August L. (January 1939). "Notes on the Early El Greco". The Burlington Magazine for Connoisseurs. 74 (430). The Burlington Magazine Publications, Ltd.: 28–29+32–33. JSTOR 867546.
- Meier-Graefe, Julius (1926). The Spanish Journey (translated from German by J. Holroyd-Reece). Jonathan Cape, London.
- Mertzios, K.D. (1961–1962). "Selections of the Registers of the Cretan Notary Michael Maras (1538–1578) (in Greek)". Cretan Chronicles. 2 (15–16): 55–71.
- Nagvi-Peters, Fatima (22 September 1997). "A Turning Point in Rilke's Evolution: The Experience of El Greco". Germanic Review. 72. Archived from the original on 29 June 2011 – via Questia.
- Pallucchini, Rodolfo (May 1948). "Some Early Works by El Greco". Burlington Magazine. 90 (542). The Burlington Magazine Publications, Ltd.: 130–135, 137. JSTOR 869910.
- Panayotakis, Nikolaos M. (1986). ""The Cretan Period of the Life of Doménicos Theotocópoulos". Festschrift In Honor Of Nikos Svoronos, Volume B. Crete University Press.
- Pijoan, Joseph (March 1930). "El Greco – A Spaniard". Art Bulletin. 12 (1). College Art Association: 12–19. doi:10.2307/3050759. JSTOR 3050759.
- Procopiou, Angelo (March 1952). "El Greco and Cretan Painting". Burlington Magazine. 94 (588). The Burlington Magazine Publications, Ltd.: 74+76–80. JSTOR 870678.
- Rassias John; Alexiou Christos; Bien Peter (1982). "Greco". Demotic Greek II: The Flying Telephone Booth. UPNE. ISBN 0-87451-208-5.
- Richardson, John (23 April 1987). "Picasso's Apocalyptic Whorehouse". The New York Review of Books. 34 (7): 40–47.
- Salas, X. de (February 1961). "The Velazquez Exhibition in Madrid". Burlington Magazine. 103 (695): 54–57.
- Sanders Alan, Kearney Richard (1998). "Changing Faces". The Wake of Imagination: Toward a Postmodern Culture. Routledge (UK). ISBN 0-415-11950-2.
- Scholz-Hänsel, Michael (1986). El Greco. Taschen. ISBN 3-8228-3171-9.
- Sethre, Janet (2003). "El Greco". The Souls of Venice. McFarland & Company. ISBN 0-7864-1573-8.
- Sheehanl, J.J. (2000). "Critiques of a Museum Culture". Museums in the German Art World. Oxford University Press US. ISBN 0-19-513572-5.
- Souchère de la, Dor (1960). Picasso à Antibes (in French). Fernan Hazan (Paris).
- Talbot Rice, David (1964). David Piper (ed.). Enjoying Paintings. London: Penguin. ASIN B000BGRP4C.
- Tazartes, Mauricia (2005). El Greco (translated in Greek by Sofia Giannetsou). Explorer. ISBN 960-7945-83-2.
- "Theotocópoulos, Doménicos". Encyclopaedia The Helios. 1952.
- Valliere, James T. (Autumn 1964). "The El Greco Influence on Jackson Pollock's Early Works". Art Journal. 24 (1). College Art Association.: 6–9. doi:10.2307/774739. JSTOR 774739.
- Wethey, Harold E. (1962). El Greco and his School (Volume II). Princeton University Press. ASIN B0007DNZV6.
- Wethey, Harold E. (1984). "El Greco in Rome and the Portrait of Vincenzo Anastagi". Studies in the History of Art. 13: 171–178.
- Wethey, Harold E.; Forsyth, G. H.; Levitine, G.; Wethey, H. E.; Kelemen, P. l. (March 1966). "Letter to the Editor". Art Bulletin. 48 (1). College Art Association.: 125–127. JSTOR 3048356.

==== Online sources ====
- Alberge, Dalya (24 August 2006). "Collector is Vindicated as Icon is Hailed as El Greco". The Times. London.
- Berg, Liisa. "El Greco in Toledo". Archived from the original on 21 June 2006.
- Cormack, Robin; Vassilaki Maria (August 2005). "The Baptism of Christ New Light on Early El Greco". Apollo Magazine.
- "Art: Dominick the Greek". Time. January 1941. Archived from the original on 26 June 2010.
- "El Greco". The Metropolitan Museum of Art, Department of European Paintings. October 2004.
- "El Greco Drawings could fetch £400,000". The Guardian. London. 23 November 2002.
- "Film on life of painter El Greco planned, Athens". Athens News Agency. 9 May 2006. Archived from the original on 11 March 2007.
- "Greece buys unique El Greco for 1.2 million dollars, Athens". Athens News Agency. 9 June 1995. Archived from the original on 29 September 2007.
- Hamerman, Nora (4 December 2003). "El Greco Paintings Lead Toward 'City of God'". Catholic Herald. Archived from the original on 26 September 2011.
- Harrison, Helen A (20 March 2005). "Art Review; Getting in Touch With That Inner El Greco". The New York Times.
- Horsley, Carter B. "The Shock of the Old".
- Irving, Mark (8 February 2004). "How to Beat the Spanish Inquisition". The Independent on Sunday. London, England. Archived from the original on 6 November 2012 – via HighBeam Research.
- Jones, Jonathan (24 January 2004). "The Reluctant Disciple". The Guardian. London.
- Kakissis, Joanna (6 March 2005). "A Cretan Village that Was the Painter's Birthplace Bridles at a nearby Town's Claim". The Boston Globe.
- Katimertzi, Paraskevi. "Cubism and El Greco (Ta Nea)". Archived from the original on 27 November 2005.
- Kimmelman, Michael (3 October 2003). "Art Review; El Greco, Bearer Of Many Gifts". The New York Times.
- McGarr, Simon. "St Francis Receiving The Stigmata". Archived from the original on 7 February 2007.
- Penny, Nicholas (4 March 2004). "At the National Gallery". London Review of Books. 26 (5).
- Searle, Adrian (10 February 2004). "Revelations – The first Major British Retrospective of El Greco Has the Power of a Hand Grenade". The Guardian. London.
- Romaine, James. "El Greco's Mystical Vision". Archived from the original on 28 September 2011.
- Russel, John (18 July 1982). "Art View; Seeing the Art of El Greco as never before". The New York Times.
