= Saint Sebastian (disambiguation) =

Saint Sebastian was an early Christian saint and martyr.

Saint Sebastian may also refer to:

== People ==
- Sevastijan Dabović (1863–1940), Serbian Orthodox saint

== Arts ==
=== Paintings ===
- Saint Sebastian (Antonello da Messina), 1477–1479
- Saint Sebastian (Botticelli), 1474
- Saint Sebastian (El Greco, 1576–1579)
- Saint Sebastian (El Greco, 1610–1614)
- Saint Sebastian (El Greco, c. 1610–1614)
- Saint Sebastian (Kubišta), 1912
- Saint Sebastian (Mantegna); three paintings, of 1456–1459, 1480, and 1490
- Saint Sebastian (Perugino, Hermitage), 1493–1494
- Saint Sebastian (Perugino, Louvre), c. 1495
- Saint Sebastian (Perugino, Stockholm), c. 1490
- Saint Sebastian (Perugino, São Paulo), c. 1507
- Saint Sebastian (Preti), c. 1657
- Saint Sebastian (Raphael), c. 1501–1502
- Saint Sebastian (Reni, Auckland), c. 1625
- Saint Sebastian (Reni, Dulwich), 1620–1639
- Saint Sebastian (Reni, Rome), c. 1615
- Saint Sebastian (Ribera, Berlin), 1636
- Saint Sebastian (Ribera, Madrid), 1636
- Saint Sebastian (Ribera, Naples), 1651
- Saint Sebastian (Rubens), c. 1614
- Saint Sebastian (Titian, Hermitage), 1570–1572

=== Sculptures ===
- Saint Sebastian (Bernini), 1617–1618

== See also ==
- Saint-Sébastien (disambiguation)
- San Sebastian (disambiguation)
- Sankt Sebastian, a municipality in Mayen-Koblenz, Rhineland-Palatinate, Germany
- Sankt Sebastian, Styria, a former municipality in Bruck-Mürzzuschlag, Styria, Austria
- San Sebastián del Oeste, a town in Mexico
