= Saint Sebastian (El Greco, 1576–1579) =

Painting by El Greco

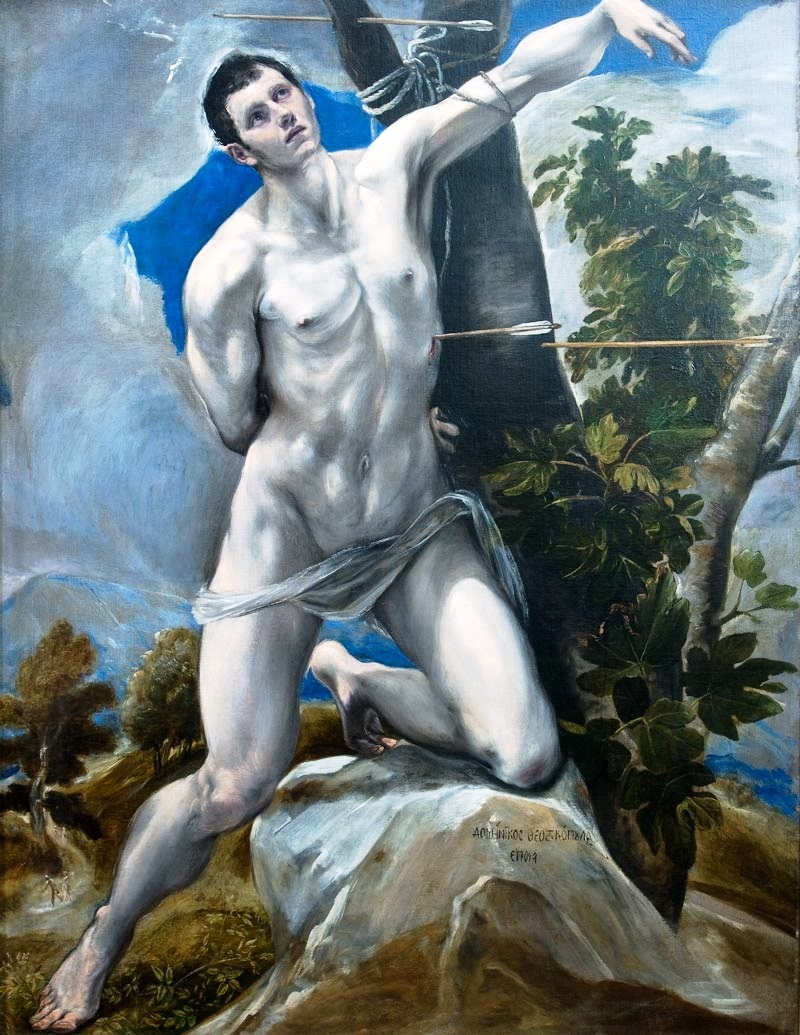
- Artist: El Greco
- Year: 1576–1579
- Medium: oil on canvas
- Dimensions: 191 cm × 152 cm (75 in × 60 in)
- Location: Sacristy of the Cathedral; Palencia, Spain

Saint Sebastian, or Martyrdom of Saint Sebastian is an autograph work by the famed artist Doménikos Theotokópoulos, commonly known as El Greco. It shows the Martyred Saint in an atypical kneeling posture which has led some scholars to believe it to be a compositional quotation of various works by other great masters whom the artist admired. The painting is currently on display in the Palencia Cathedral.

== An uncertain history and ownership ==
The precise details of the provenance of this particular work are, of necessity, based largely on conjecture. Based on stylistic clues and the available documentation, scholars have dated it to El Greco's first decade in Spain, or roughly 1576–79. Many scholars have suggested that as El Greco's first major commission in Spain, the decoration of three altarpieces in the convent Santo Domingo el Antiguo (Monastery of Saint Dominic of Silos (the Old))—as indicated by a contract signed a month after that for The Disrobing of Christ which would hang in the vestry of the Cathedral at Toledo—was obtained for him by Diego de Castilla, dean of the cathedral and father of El Greco's friend Luis it might be logically assumed that the Martyrdom of Saint Sebastian was painted for the same patron. Indeed, the assumption, based on stylistic similarity and the historical timeline of the Cretan painter's career, seems to have obtained such currency that Johnathan Brown, for example, in his discussion of the Palencia Sebastian, simply notes that it was “possibly painted for Diego de Castilla” without further discussion. And yet, this assignment of patronage is not universally accepted. Providing an alternative theory of how the painting came to Palencia, Jesus San Martin Payo, based on his study of a sixteenth century manuscript by Dr. Ascencio Garcia on the history of the diocese of Palencia, suggests that the painting was originally owned by Don Juan Alonso de Cordoba the “right arm of the bishop don Juan Ramirez Zapata de Cardenas, patron of the chapel of San Jeronimo, and in whose sacristy” (brazo derecho del obispo don Juan Ramirez Zapata de Cardenas, patrono de la capilla de San Jeronimo, y en cuya sacristia) the painting by El Greco can currently be found. As Juan Ramirez Zapata de Cardenas served as Bishop of the diocese from 1570 until his death in 1577, this alternative theory would indicate that the Martyrdom of Saint Sebastian would actually predate El Espolio, or The Disrobing of Christ, which is generally considered the artist's first known Spanish work.

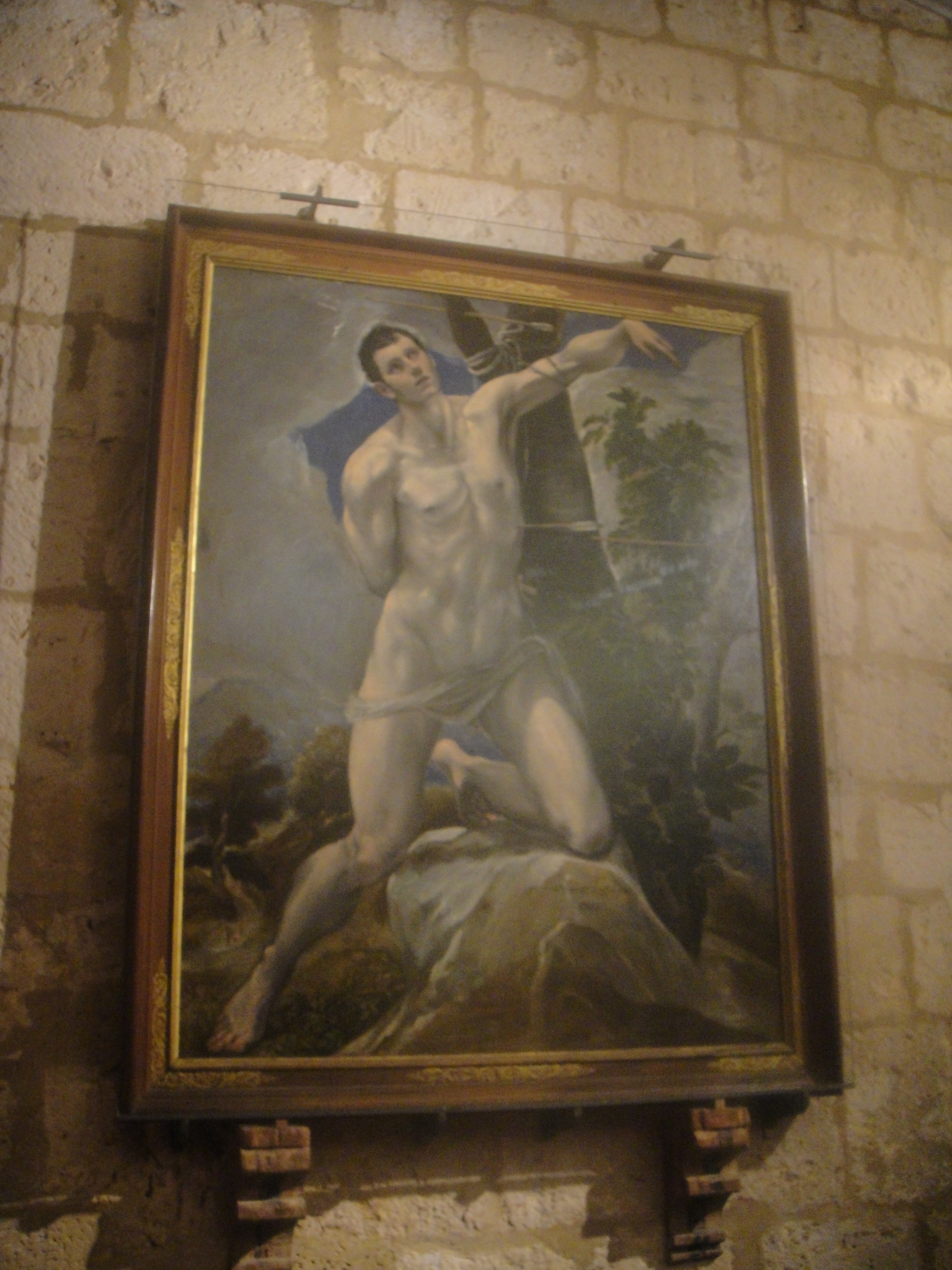
The painting at Palencia Cathedral

== Theme ==
The painting depicts Saint Sebastian, as a victim of Diocletian's suppression of Christianity during the 4th century AD. According to popular legend, Sebastian was bound to a tree and shot with arrows, but was miraculously rescued and healed, only to achieve martyrdom when he was clubbed to death shortly thereafter. Saint Sebastian is a popular saint in both the Roman Catholic and Greek Orthodox traditions. Pierced with arrows—a symbol associated with divine punishment in the form of pestilence since antiquity—and yet miraculously saved from near death, Saint Sebastian was often invoked to intercede on the behalf of plague victims in the 15th and 16th centuries when the painting would have first been put on display. Perhaps because of the popularity of Saint Sebastian during the second plague pandemic, or because his martyrdom offered Counter-Reformation era artists one of the few opportunities to portray the nude in religious art, there are numerous examples of the Saint painted by El Greco and his contemporaries and an established iconographical schema for his portrayal.

== Description ==
The Martyrdom of Saint Sebastian, as noted by Brown, is painted in the late-Renaissance style and shows El Greco's Italian training to fine advantage. The figure is graceful and naturalistic. The eyes are cast heavenward, either in communion with god or in acceptance of his own impending death. El Greco's Sebastian seems resigned to, or perhaps even enjoying his martyrdom. While perhaps slightly elongated, the solitary nude figure is solidly fleshy and certainly shows none of the extreme exaggeration in contrasting highlights or pigmentation for which the artist would later be known. Behind the figure, a somewhat stormy landscape is indicated with loose, gestural brushstrokes. Similar to most portrayals, the saint is shown bound to a tree and pierced in the side with an arrow. And yet, the Palencia Sebastian, unlike El Greco's other surviving portrayal of the saint, currently in the Museo del Prado, deviates in one significant way from the traditional iconography. Rather than painting a standing figure, as most artists portraying the saint did and as he would in the Prado Sebastian, the Palencia Sebastian is crouched in a kneeling posture, bound to the tree by a rope that passes around a raised arm, the bulk of his weight supported by the large rock on which El Greco signed the painting.

== Comparisons with Michelangelo and Titian ==
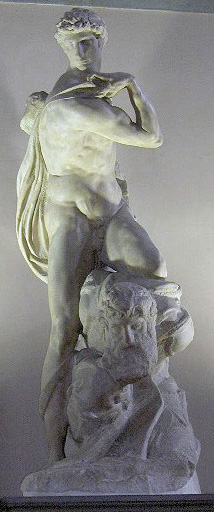
The Genius of Victory, by Michelangelo (1532-4)

Much has been made of this unusual posture. As Andrew Casper says in his Art and the Religious image in El Greco's Italy, the figure in Saint Sebastian is a quotation of a “figure taken from Michelangelo's body of work—though scholars do not agree on which one.”

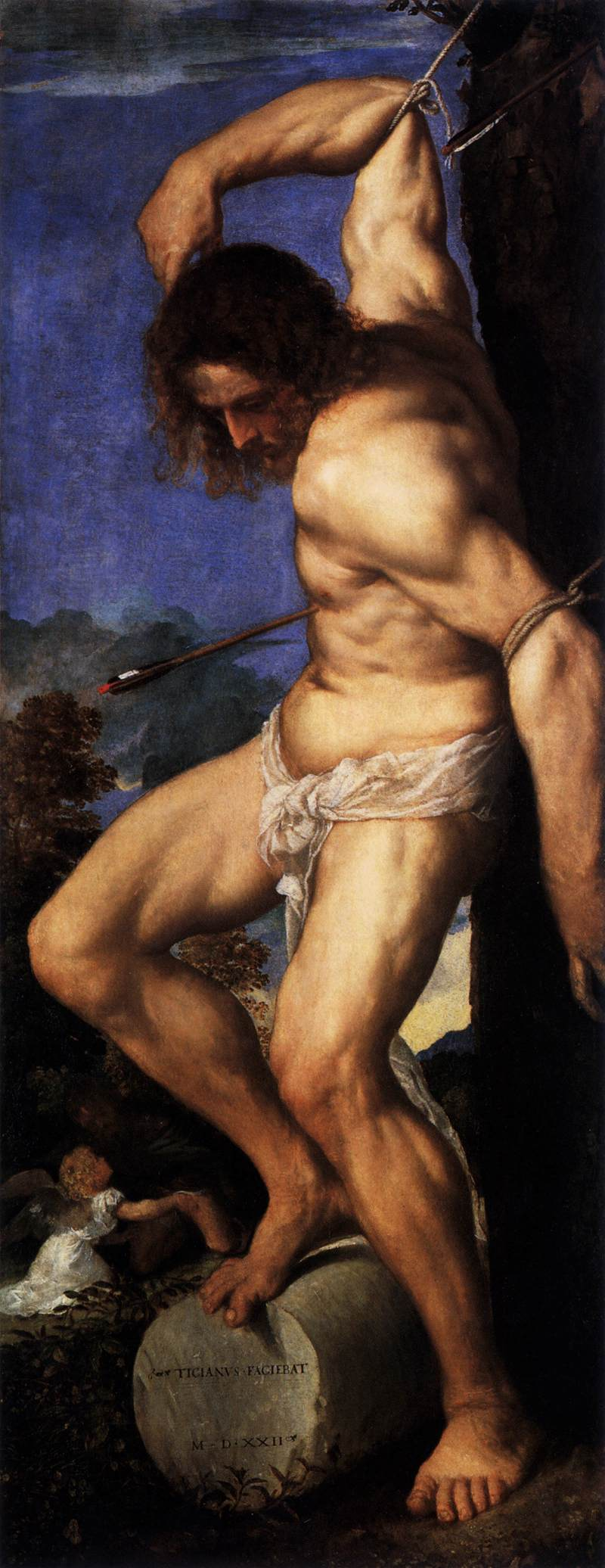
Detail from Titian's Averoldi Altarpiece

Certainly a number of scholars have made much of the seeming comparison between El Greco's Sebastian and various figures from Michelangelo's body of work. In his work on El Greco, Michael Scholz-Hansel states without prelude that the figure is “based on Michelangelo as well as on the renowned Greco-Roman statue of Laocoön and His Sons which the artist had evidently studied in the original.” Based on a visual comparison of the posture of the Palencia Sebastian with Michelangelo's statue of The Genius of Victory, produced for the tomb of Julius II and now in the Palazzo Vecchio, Harold Wethey argued that Sebastian's unique posture in El Greco's painting was based on Michelangelo's sculpture, and is thus evidence of the esteem in which the painter held the giant of renaissance art, his own documented words notwithstanding. For Wethey, El Greco's supposed quotation of Michelangelo's sculpture indicates that El Greco's statement to Pacheco that Michelangelo did not know how to paint is better understood embedded within the context of the longstanding aesthetic debate over the relative virtues of 'disegno e colore' [design or drawing and color] and that, rather than a criticism of Michelangelo per se, it merely establishes that El Greco felt firmly that color is more important than design when it comes to painting. Similarly, in a detailed analysis of El Greco's various recorded statements on Michelangelo, George A. Rodetis compares the posture of El Greco's Martyrdom of Saint Sebastian with that of the Punishment of Haman in Michelangelo's fresco on the ceiling of the Sistine Chapel, suggesting that El Greco's emulation of the Florentine artist indicates that his derogatory statements about the painting skills of the latter can be better understood more as an indictment of the limits of fresco to portray the spiritual essence of a scene than a complaint about Michelangelo's mastery of his medium.

And yet, Rodetis does not base his entire analysis of El Greco's opinion of Michelangelo or his thoughts on the paragone [comparison of or rivalry between] relating to disegno and colore on certain compositional similarities of El Greco's work with that of Michelangelo. Indeed, he makes a point of clarifying that the seeming similarity of posture between Michelangelo's tortured Haman and El Greco's Sebastian might not necessarily indicate that the Cretan painter was paying homage to the Florentine and suggests as equally, if not more, probable the possibility that El Greco, familiar with Titian's treatment of Saint Sebastian in his Averoldi Altarpiece, might have used the Venetian master's work as a model. The Sebastian depicted by Titian is, like El Greco's hanging from bonds which tie his elbows to a tree, and that, similar to El Greco's signature on the stone under the saint's left knee, Titian chose to sign his piece on the stone under his Sebastian's foot.

== See also ==
- List of works by El Greco
- Saint Sebastian (El Greco, 1610-1614)

== Sources ==
- Brown, Jonathan. "El Greco and Toledo". In El Greco of Toledo, 75–147. Boston: Little, Brown and Company, 1982.
- Casper, Andrew. Art and the Religious Image in El Greco's Italy. Philadelphia: Penn State university Press, 2014.
- Gelpi, Armand P. “Saint Sebastian and the Black Death.” Vesalius, IV, no 1 (1998): 23–30.
- Liepa, Valentina. The Image of Saint Sebastian in Art. (2009)
- Rodetis, George A. “El Greco's Statements on Michelangelo the Painter.” The Journal of Aesthetic Education, Vol. 31, No.3 (1997): 25–37. JSTOR 3333485
- San Martin Payo, Jesus. “Gestiones Realizadas Por El Cabildo De Palencia Para Encontrar y Trasladar El Cuerpo de su Patrono S. Antolin 1606-1609 Con la Vida y Martririo del Santo” [Proceedings Carried Out By The Cabildo De Palencia To Find and Relocate The Body of its Patron S. Antolin 1606-1609 With the Life and Martyrdom of the Saint]. (1986) 181–243. Accessed from the Catedral de Palencia website, November 2017, http://catedraldepalencia.org/wp-content/uploads/2015/02/SANMARTIN_PITTM_54_1986.pdf.
- Scholz-Hansel, Michael. El Greco. Taschen Basic Art, 2004.
- Wethey, Harold E. “El Greco in Rome and the Portrait of Vincenzo Anastagi.” Studies in the History of Art, Vol. 13 (1984): 171–178. JSTOR 42617974
