= Fort São Sebastião =

Fort São Sebastião (Portuguese, Saint Sebastian) may refer to:

== Places ==
=== Africa ===
- Fort São Sebastião (Mozambique), a fort in Mozambique
- Fort São Sebastião (São Tomé), a fort on the island of São Tomé
- Fort São Sebastião de Xama, a fort in Ghana

=== Brazil ===
- Fortaleza de São Sebastião do Castelo, a demolished fortress previously located in Rio de Janeiro
- Forte de São Sebastião de Alcântara, a ruined fortress located in Maranhão
- Fortim de São Sebastião, a fortress in Ceara

=== India ===
- Fortaleza de São Sebastião de Baçaim, a ruined fort in Vasai
- Fortaleza de São Sebastião, a fort near Tivim

=== Portugal ===
- Forte de São Sebastião (Angra do Heroísmo), a fort in Angra do Heroísmo
- Forte de São Sebastião do Porto Novo, a fort in Vila de São Sebastião
- Forte de São Sebastião do Caniço, a fort in Caniço
- Fort of São Sebastião de Caparica, a fort in Caparica
- Fort São Sebastião (Castro Marim), a fort in Castro Marim
- Forte de São Sebastião da Horta, a fort in Angústias

== See also ==
- São Sebastião (disambiguation)
- San Sebastian (disambiguation) (English)
- Saint-Sébastien (disambiguation) (French)
- San Sebastian (disambiguation) (Spanish)
