= São Sebastião =

São Sebastião (Portuguese for "Saint Sebastian") may refer to:

== Places ==
=== Brazil ===
- São Sebastião, Alagoas
- São Sebastião, São Paulo

- São Sebastião Island, the main island of the nearby archipelago city of Ilhabela, São Paulo

- São Sebastião da Amoreira, Paraná
- São Sebastião da Bela Vista, Minas Gerais
- São Sebastião da Boa Vista, Pará
- São Sebastião da Grama, São Paulo
- São Sebastião da Vargem Alegre, Minas Gerais
- São Sebastião de Lagoa de Roça, Paraíba
- São Sebastião do Alto, Rio de Janeiro
- São Sebastião do Anta, Minas Gerais
- São Sebastião do Caí, Rio Grande do Sul
- São Sebastião do Maranhão, Minas Gerais
- São Sebastião do Oeste, Minas Gerais
- São Sebastião do Paraíso, Minas Gerais
- São Sebastião do Passé, Bahia
- São Sebastião do Rio Preto, Minas Gerais
- São Sebastião do Rio Verde, Minas Gerais
- São Sebastião do Tocantins, Tocantins
- São Sebastião do Uatumã, Amazonas
- São Sebastião do Umbuzeiro, Paraíba

=== Portugal ===
- São Sebastião (Guimarães), a civil parish in the municipality of Guimarães
- São Sebastião (Lagos), a civil parish in the municipality of Lagos
- São Sebastião (Loulé), a civil parish in the municipality of Loulé
- São Sebastião (Rio Maior), a civil parish in the municipality of Rio Maior
- São Sebastião (Setúbal), a civil parish in the municipality of Setúbal
- São Sebastião da Pedreira, a former civil parish in the municipality of Lisbon
  - São Sebastião (Lisbon Metro), a railway station
- São Sebastião (Ponta Delgada), a civil parish in the municipality of Ponta Delgada, Azores
- Vila de São Sebastião, a civil parish in the municipality of Angra do Heroísmo, Azores

=== São Tomé and Príncipe ===
- São Sebastião Museum

== Other uses ==
- São Sebastião River (disambiguation)
- Fort São Sebastião (disambiguation)
- The full traditional name of the city of Rio de Janeiro is São Sebastião do Rio de Janeiro

== See also ==
- Sebastião (disambiguation)
- San Sebastian (disambiguation)
- Saint-Sébastien (disambiguation)
