= Santo Domingo el Antiguo Altarpiece =

Painting series by El Greco

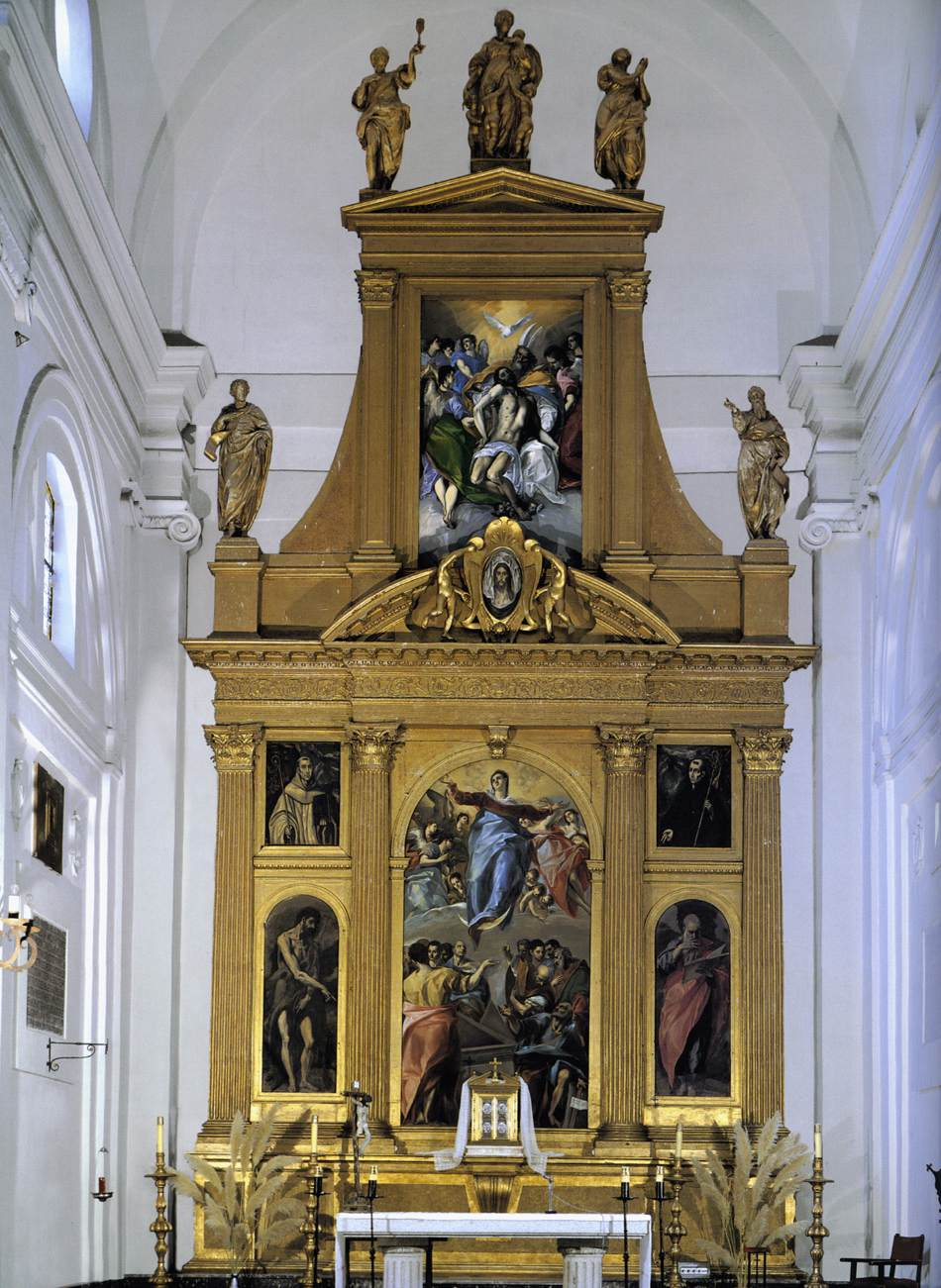
- Artist: El Greco
- Year: 1577-1579

The Santo Domingo el Antiguo Altarpiece is a 1577-1579 altarpiece by El Greco, painted for the Monastery of Santo Domingo el Antiguo in Toledo, Spain. The artist had just arrived in Spain and this was his first major commission there, gained thanks to Diego de Castilla, who he had met in Rome.

The total commission was for nine canvases, seven for the high altar and two for side altars. The high altarpiece was made up of an upper main canvas (The Holy Trinity), a lower main canvas (Assumption of the Virgin), four flanking panels of saints (St John the Evangelist, St John the Baptist, St Bernard and St Benedict) and a small painting on the tympanum between the two main paintings (Sudarium). Of these, only the original panels of St John the Baptist and St John the Evangelist remain in situ, along with the painting for the right-hand side altarpiece, Resurrection. Assumption is now in the Art Institute of Chicago and Holy Trinity in the Prado Museum. The rest are replaced in the church by copies.

In 2025, most of the Altarpiece was reunited in an exhibit, El Greco. Santo Domingo el Antiguo, at the Prado Museum.

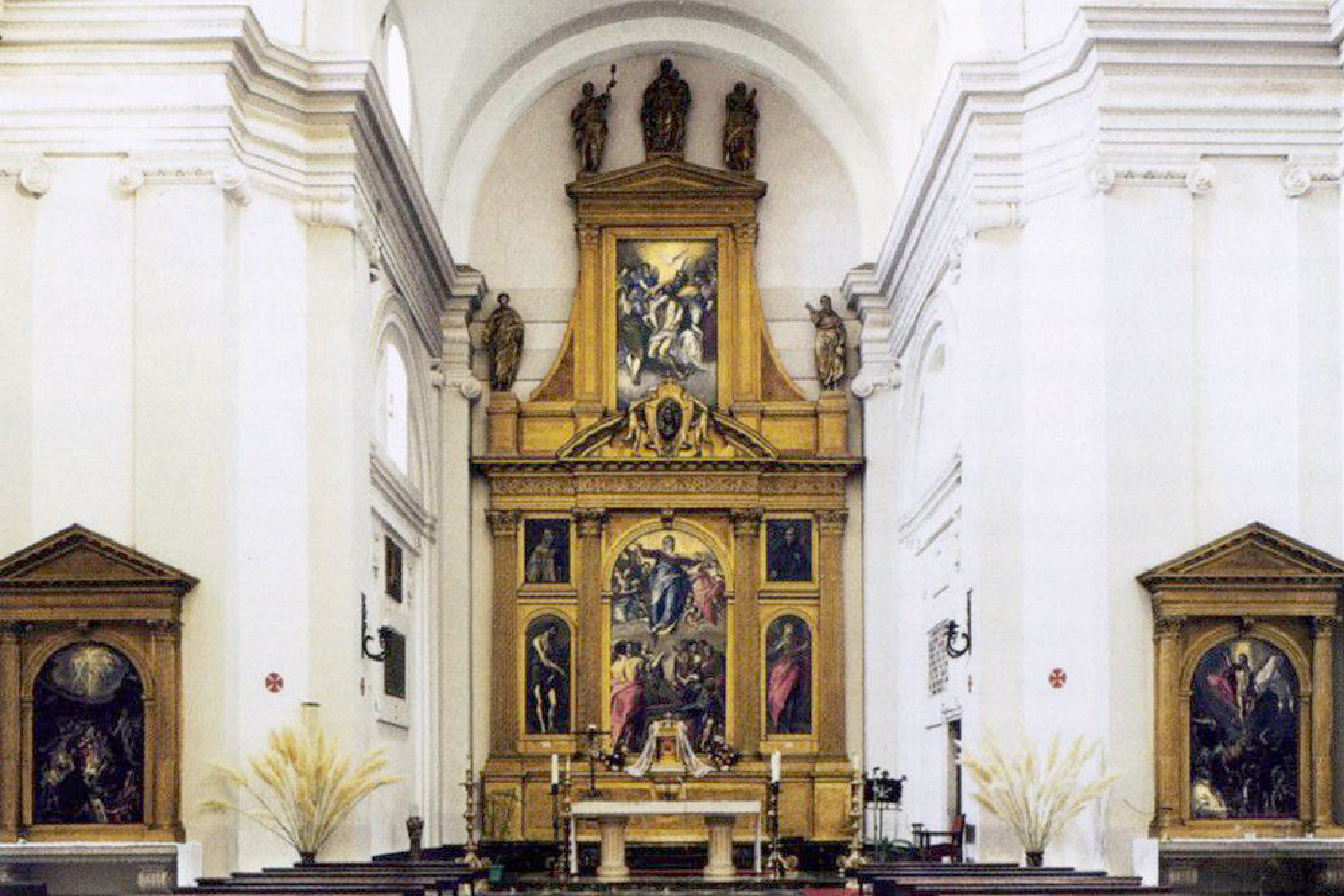
Wider photo showing the two side altars

== See also ==
- List of works by El Greco
