= Adoration of the Shepherds (El Greco, Madrid) =

Painting by El Greco

The Adoration of the Shepherds
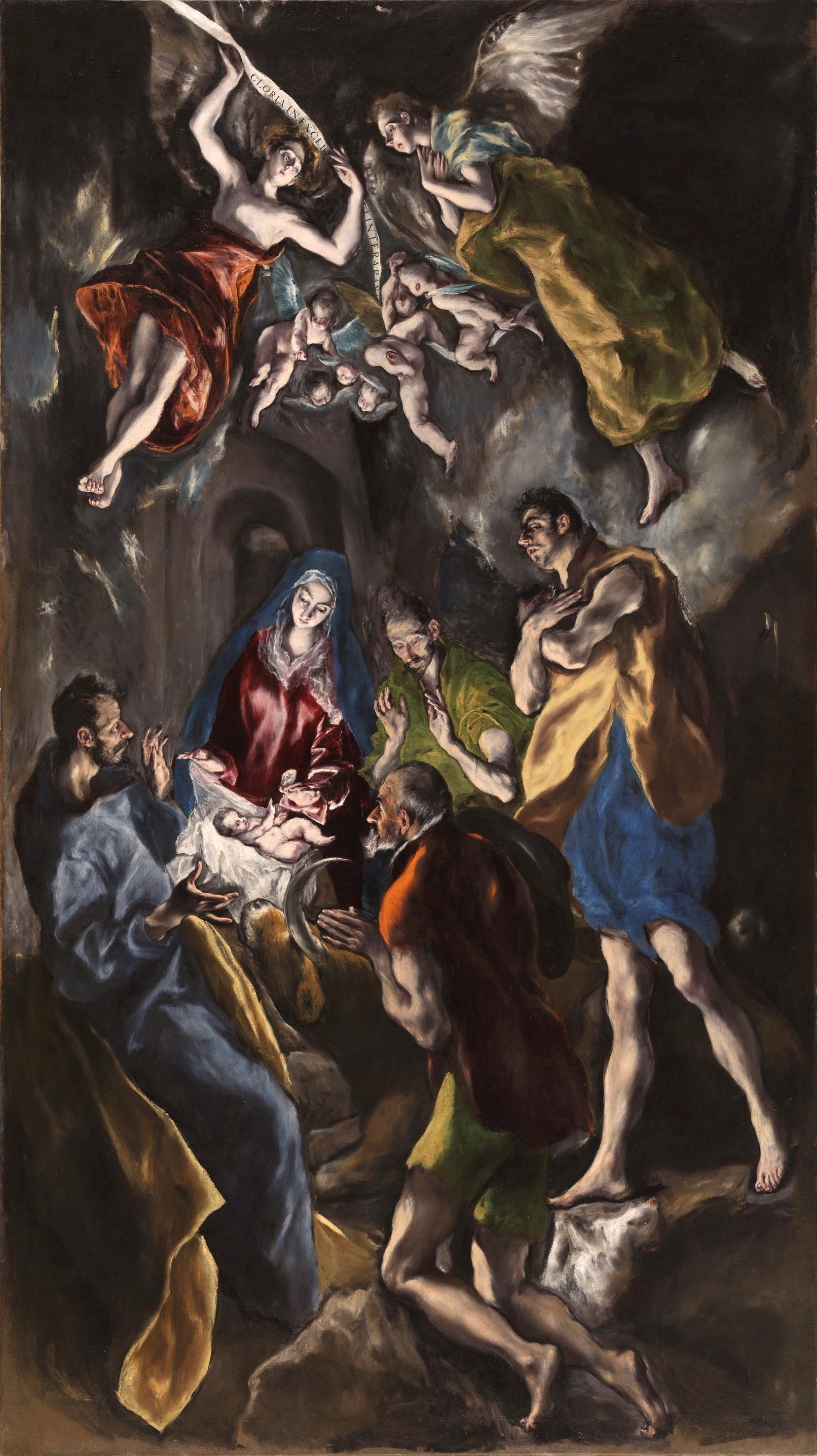
- Artist: El Greco
- Year: 1612–1614
- Medium: Oil on canvas
- Dimensions: 319 cm × 180 cm (126 in × 71 in)
- Location: Museo del Prado; Madrid

The Adoration of the Shepherds is a painting of the traditional subject which was painted during the last year of El Greco's life. The painting is a work which the artist made to hang over his own tomb in the convent of Santo Domingo el Antiguo in Toledo. His signature, in Greek, may be seen in the lower left corner.

El Greco's remains were transferred to another church after a few years, but the painting remained at Santo Domingo until the 20th century. The painting is now in the Museo del Prado which states that it can be considered the artist's last work.

== Description ==
Extreme distortion of body characterizes the Adoration of the Shepherds like all the last paintings of El Greco. The infant Christ seems to emit a light which plays off the faces of the barefoot shepherds who have gathered to pay homage to his miraculous birth. A rhythmic energy animates the painting, expressed in the dance-like motions of the figures. Striking contrasts between light and dark passages heighten the sense of drama. The group of angels which hovers over the scene may resemble the missing section of The Opening of the Fifth Seal.

== See also ==
- List of works by El Greco
