= Saint Sebastian (El Greco, c. 1610–1614) =

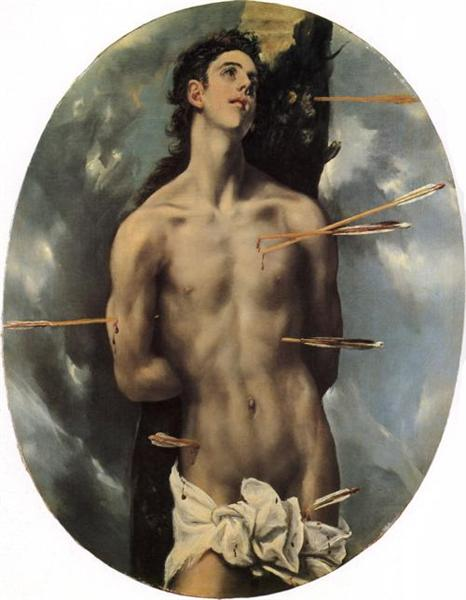

Saint Sebastian is a c.1600-1605 or c.1610-1614 oil on canvas painting by El Greco. In catalogue raisonnés of El Greco's works it appears as no. 280 (Harold Wethey) and no. 122 (Tiziana Frati). Now oval, it was probably cut down from its original rectangular (and probably full-length) format at an unknown date and shows marked similarities to the Prado version by the same artist. Excessive cleaning has led to it losing its glaze.

Its listing at a Christie's New York sale in early 2025 stated it was acquired in 1898 by Carol I of Romania, who bequeathed it to the Romanian royal collection, and that it then remained in Romania until 1976, when ownership was transferred to art dealer Wildenstein & Company. It was removed from sale on 5 February after a claim from the Romanian government that it had been taken from Romania illegally in 1947 by Carol's descendent Michael I after his abdication.
