= Sebastião =

Sebastião is Portuguese for Sebastian.

This name may refer to:

== People ==
- Sebastião (given name)

== Places ==
- Sebastião Barros, a town in the state of Piauí, Brazil
- Sebastião Laranjeiras, a city in the state of Bahia, Brazil
- Sebastião Leal, a town in the state of Piauí, Brazil

== Other ==
- São Sebastião, Portuguese for Saint Sebastian
