= Bohumil Kubišta =

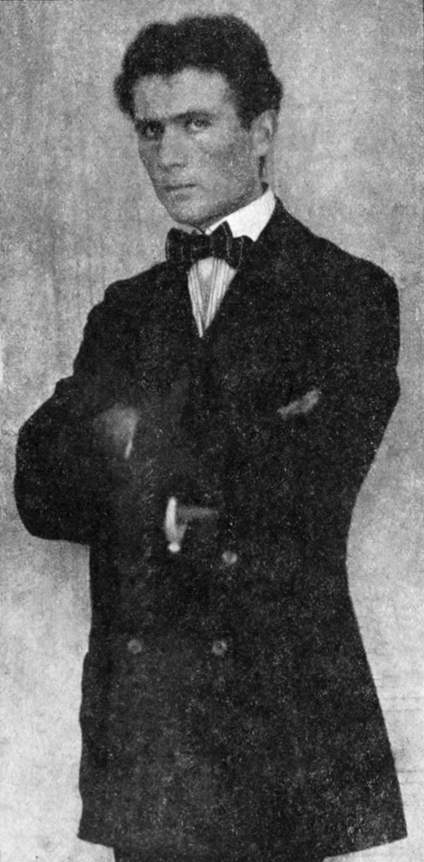
Kubišta in 1911

Bohumil Kubišta (21 August 1884 – 27 November 1918) was a Czech painter and art critic, one of the founders of Czech modern painting. He, Emil Filla, Antonín Procházka, and five others founded Osma ('The Eight'), an Expressionist-oriented group of artists.

== Life ==
Kubišta was born on 21 August 1884 in Vlčkovice, Bohemia, Austria-Hungary (today part of Praskačka, Czech Republic). He studied at the Academy of Fine Arts in Prague, but left in 1906 to study at the Reale Istituto di Belle Arti in Florence. He died on 27 November 1918 in Prague.

== Work ==
Kubišta came to his individual expression gradually, at first he was influenced by the work of Vincent van Gogh and Paul Cézanne. He educated himself in philosophy and optics, and studied colour and the geometrical construction of painting.

Kubišta, like several other Czech artists of his generation, was strongly affected by the 1905 Edvard Munch exhibition in Prague. Together with Emil Filla he established the artistic group Osma in 1906 or 1907. He worked in an Expressionist style until 1910, and exchanged ideas with German painters in Die Brücke. He also developed visual ideas learned from the work of Cézanne. His later style (approximately from 1911) was strongly influenced by Expressionism and Cubism. Expressionist elements, particularly his use of colour but also his subject matter, immediately distinguish Kubišta's Cubist work (such as his 1912 Saint Sebastian) from that of founding Paris Cubists Picasso, Braque and the Section d'Or. He studied colour theory, analyzing the harmonic and compositional principles of painters such as El Greco, Eugène Delacroix, Vincent van Gogh, and Edvard Munch. He also paid close attention to mathematical and geometric principles. Around 1911, he became acquainted with Jan Zrzavý and the artistic group Sursum.

Kubišta joined the army in 1913. He died during the global 1918 flu pandemic which ravaged Europe during and after World War I.

== Paintings ==
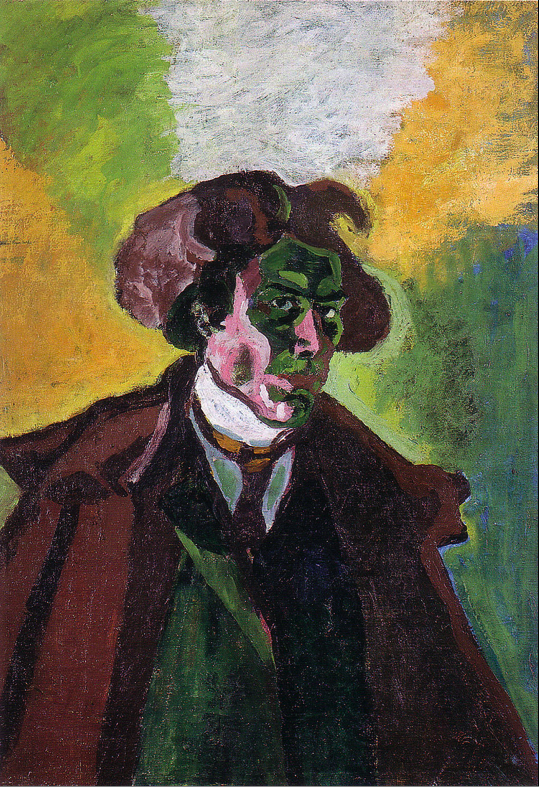
Self-portrait, 1908

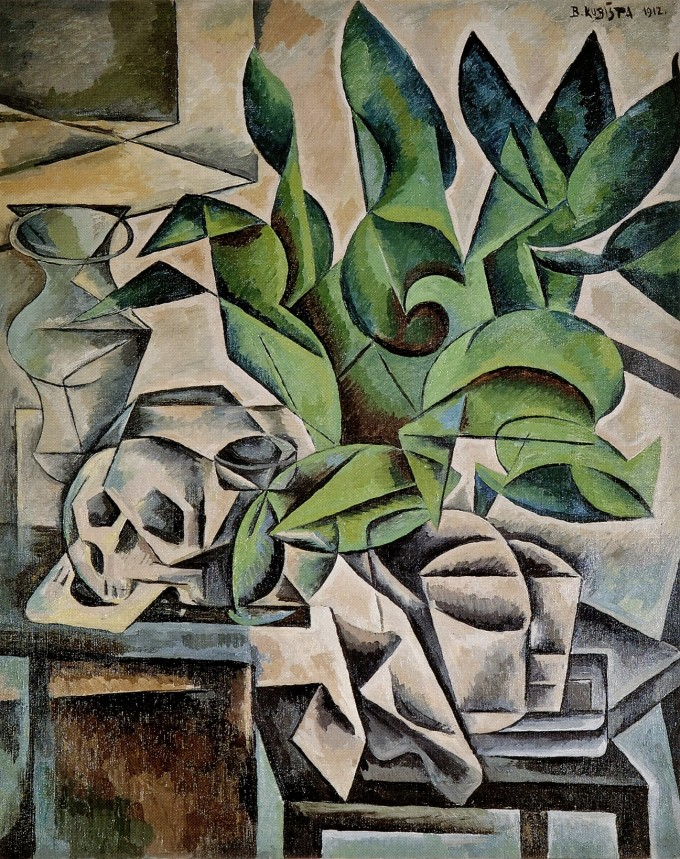
Still life with Skull, 1912

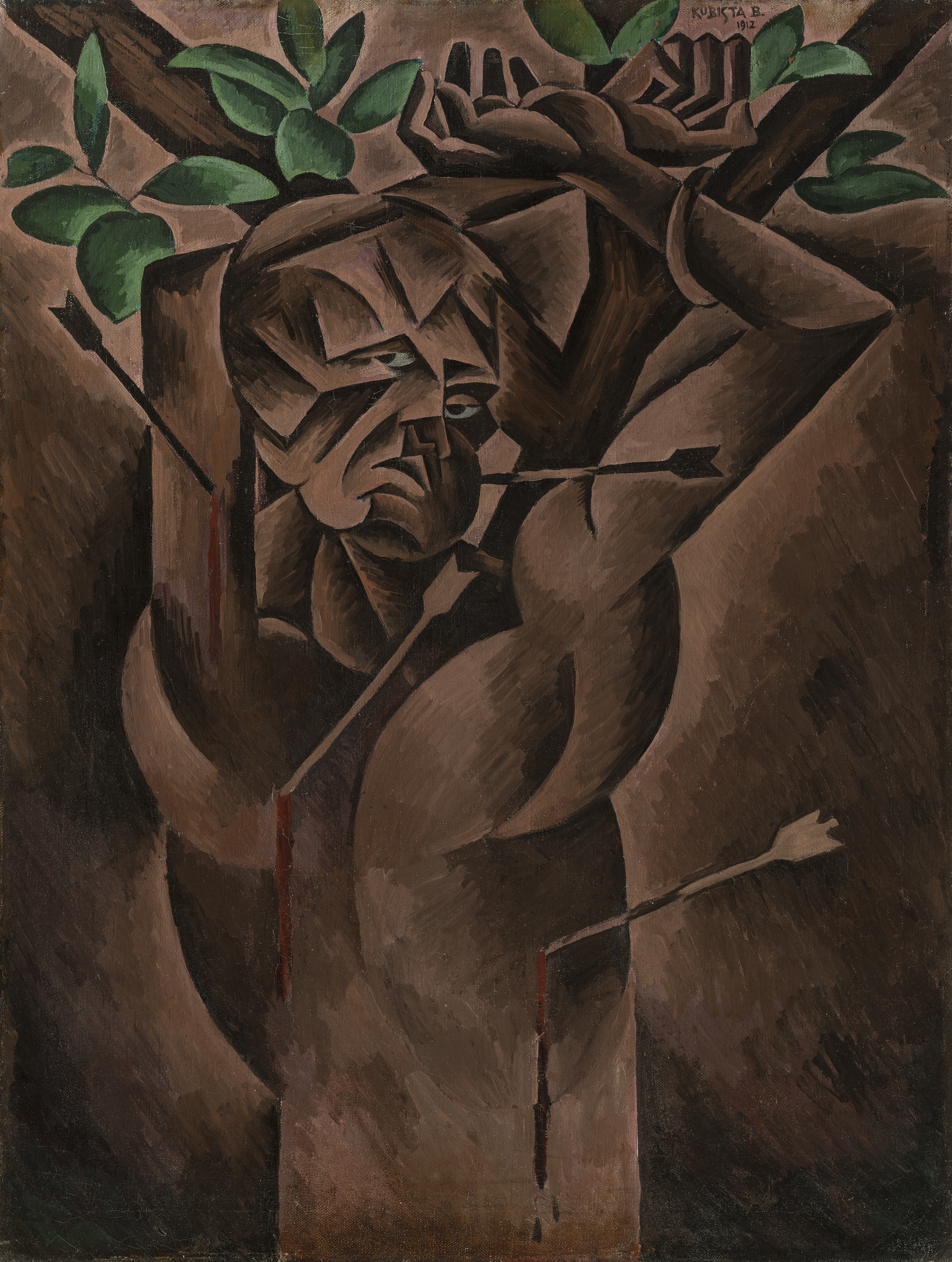
St Sebastian, 1912

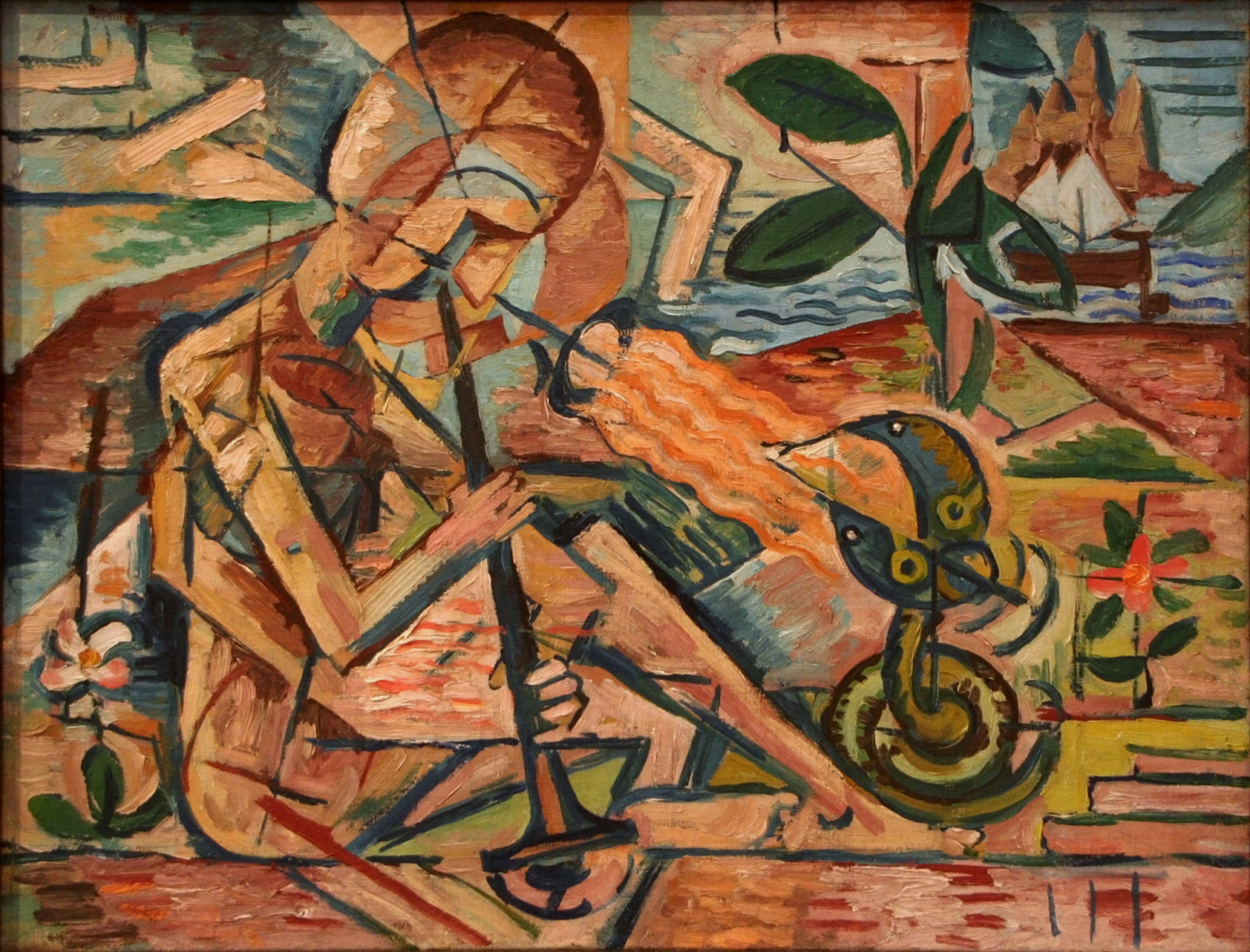
Fakir Taming Snakes, 1915

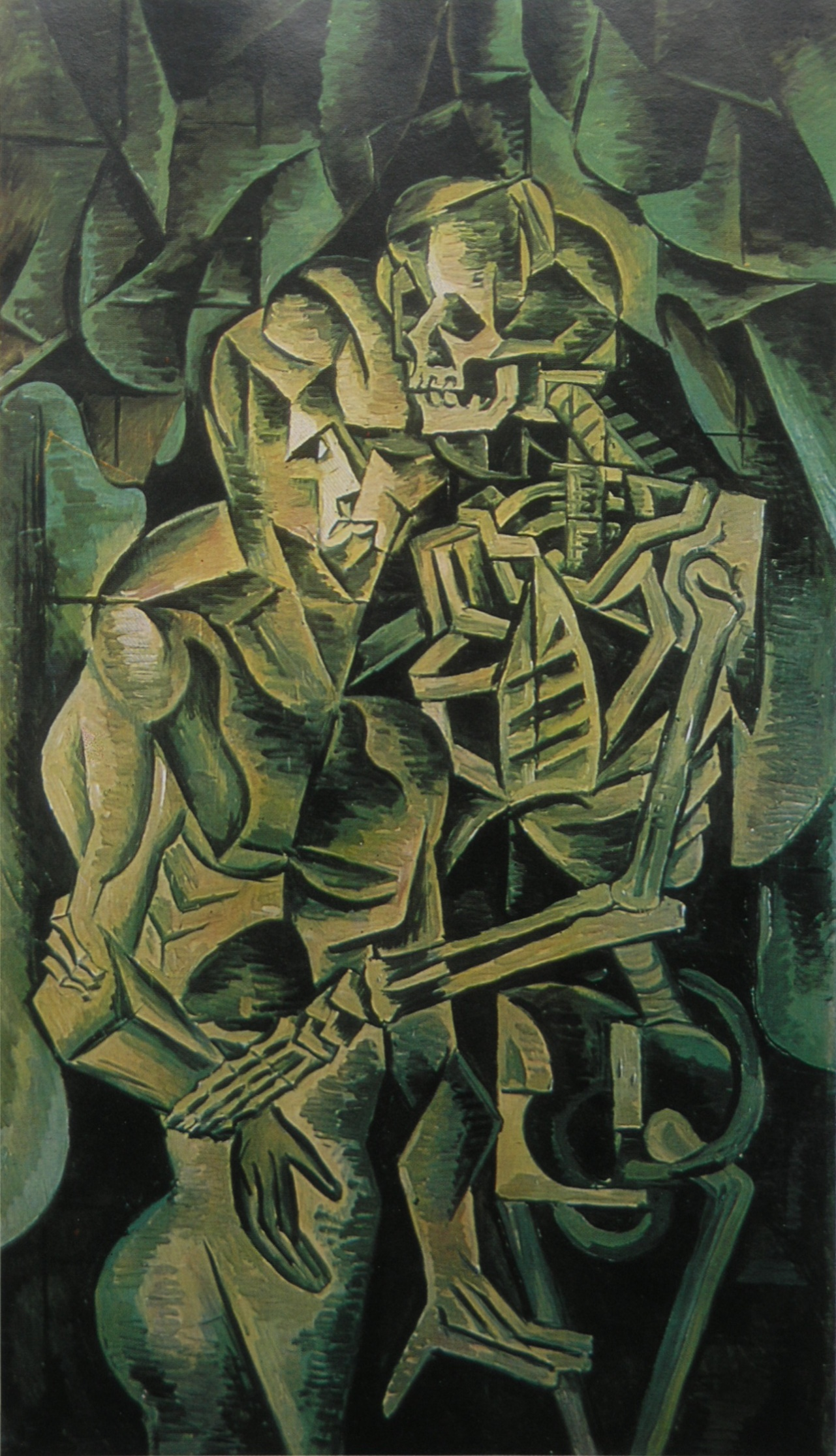
Kiss of death, 1912
