= Palencia Cathedral =

Church in Palencia, Spain

Coordinates: 42°0′40″N 4°32′13″W

Cathedral Basilica of Saint Antoninus
- Catedral-Basílica de San Antolín
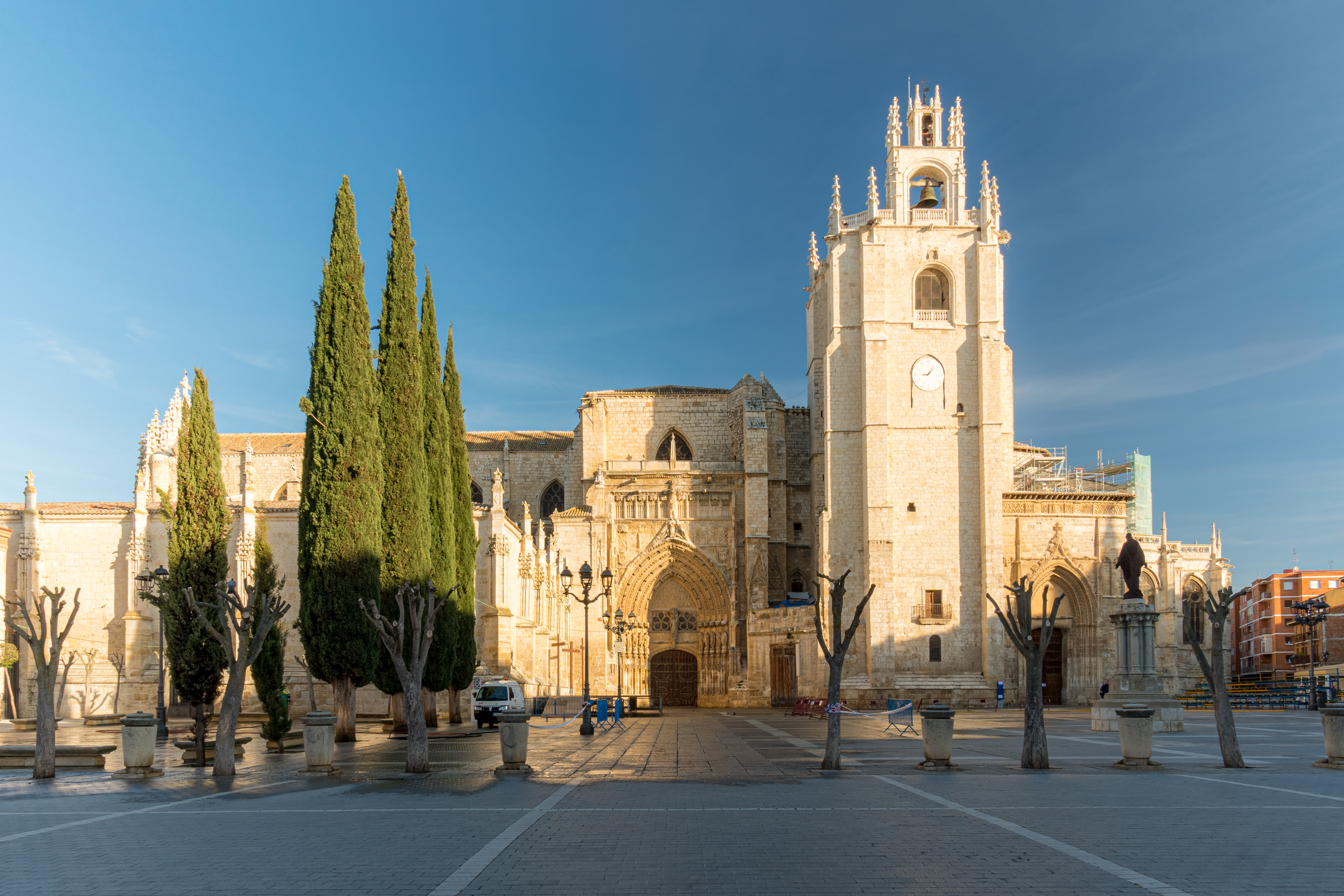
- South Façade

Religion
- Affiliation: Roman Catholic Church
- Year consecrated: 1897 (Note: Formally consecrated in 1897 after lack of evidence that it was done before.)

Location
- Location: Palencia, Spain
- Interactive map of Cathedral Basilica of Saint Antoninus

Architecture
- Type: church
- Style: Gothic
- Groundbreaking: 1321
- Completed: 1516

Specifications
- Direction of façade: south
- Elevation: 42 m (138 ft)

Website
- catedraldepalencia.org

The Cathedral Basilica of Saint Antoninus (Spanish: Catedral-Basílica de San Antolín) is a Roman Catholic church located in Palencia, Spain. It is dedicated to Saint Antoninus of Pamiers.

== History ==
The cathedral was built from 1172 to 1504 stands over a low-vaulted Visigothic crypt (the Crypt of San Antolín). In front of the Proto-Romanesque temple is the old Visigothic chapel from the mid-7th century, built during the reign of Wamba to preserve the remains of the martyr Saint Antoninus of Pamiers, a Visigothic-Gallic nobleman brought from Narbonne to Visigothic Hispania in 672 or 673 by Wamba himself. These are the only remains of the Visigothic cathedral of Palencia.

Its more than 130 metres long, 42 metres high and 50 metres wide at the centre, making it one of the largest cathedrals in Spain and Europe. Just by way of comparison, the internal length of the Cathedral of Reims, reaches 138m, in turn, the height of the central nave, reaches 33m in Notre Dame de Paris; Reims 38m, 42m in Notre-Dame d'Amiens and 48m in Saint-Pierre de Beauvais, the highest of all Gothic cathedrals. Its solid, simple and austere exterior does not reflect the grandeur of its interior, with more than twenty chapels of great artistic and historical interest. The most recognizable feature on the outside is the tower, of 55 meters of height, solid and a little rough in its Gothic style. Recent studies and excavations show that it was a military tower, and after serving this function, pinnacles and cattail were added as the sole decoration.

It is a large Gothic building, popularly dubbed as "the unknown beauty" because it is not as well known as other Spanish cathedrals, though it is a valuable building which has in its interior works of art of great value, including El Greco's painting The Martyrdom of Saint Sebastian (1576–1579) and a retablo of twelve panels by Juan de Flandes, court painter to Queen Isabella I of Castile.

== Gallery ==
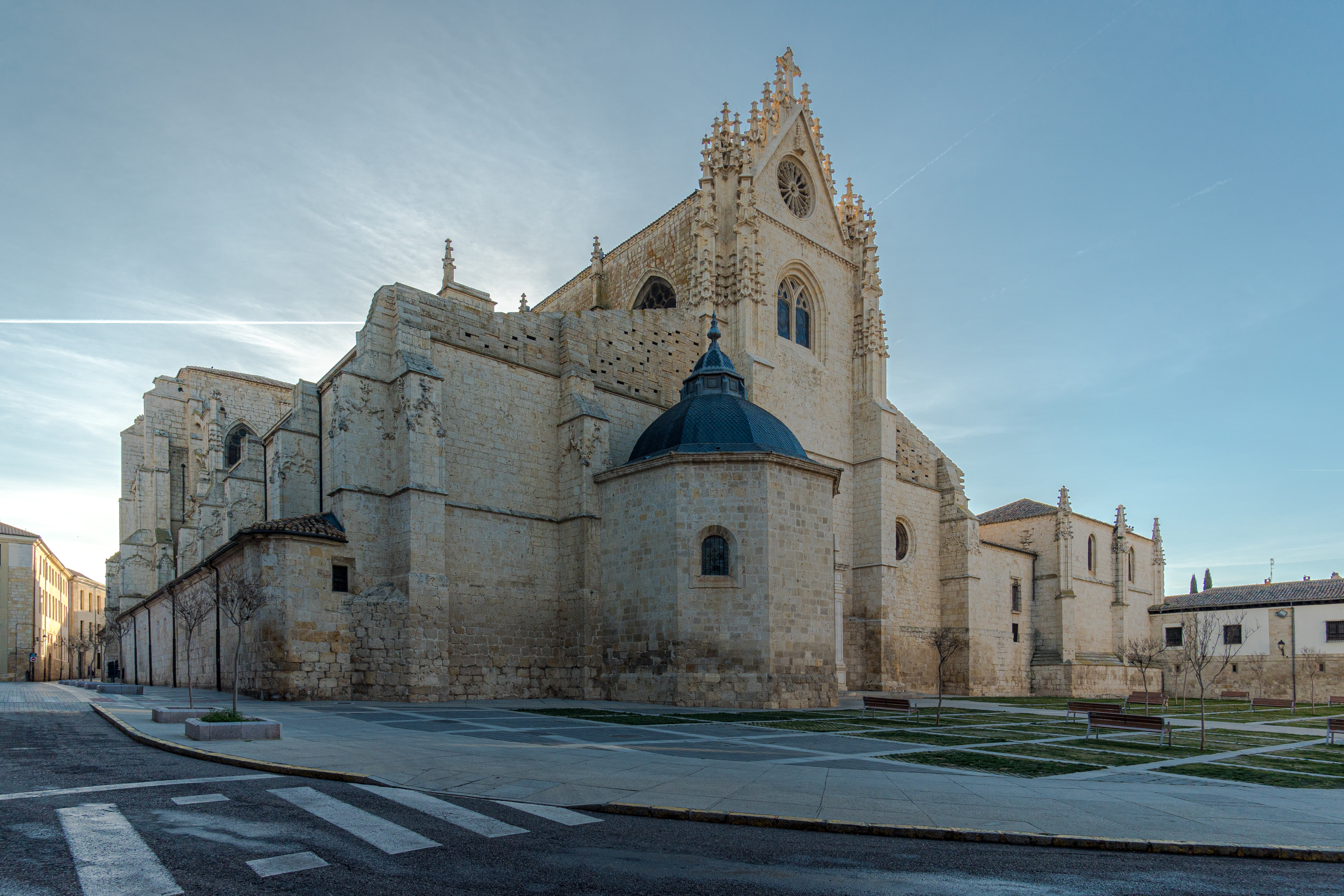
West Façade

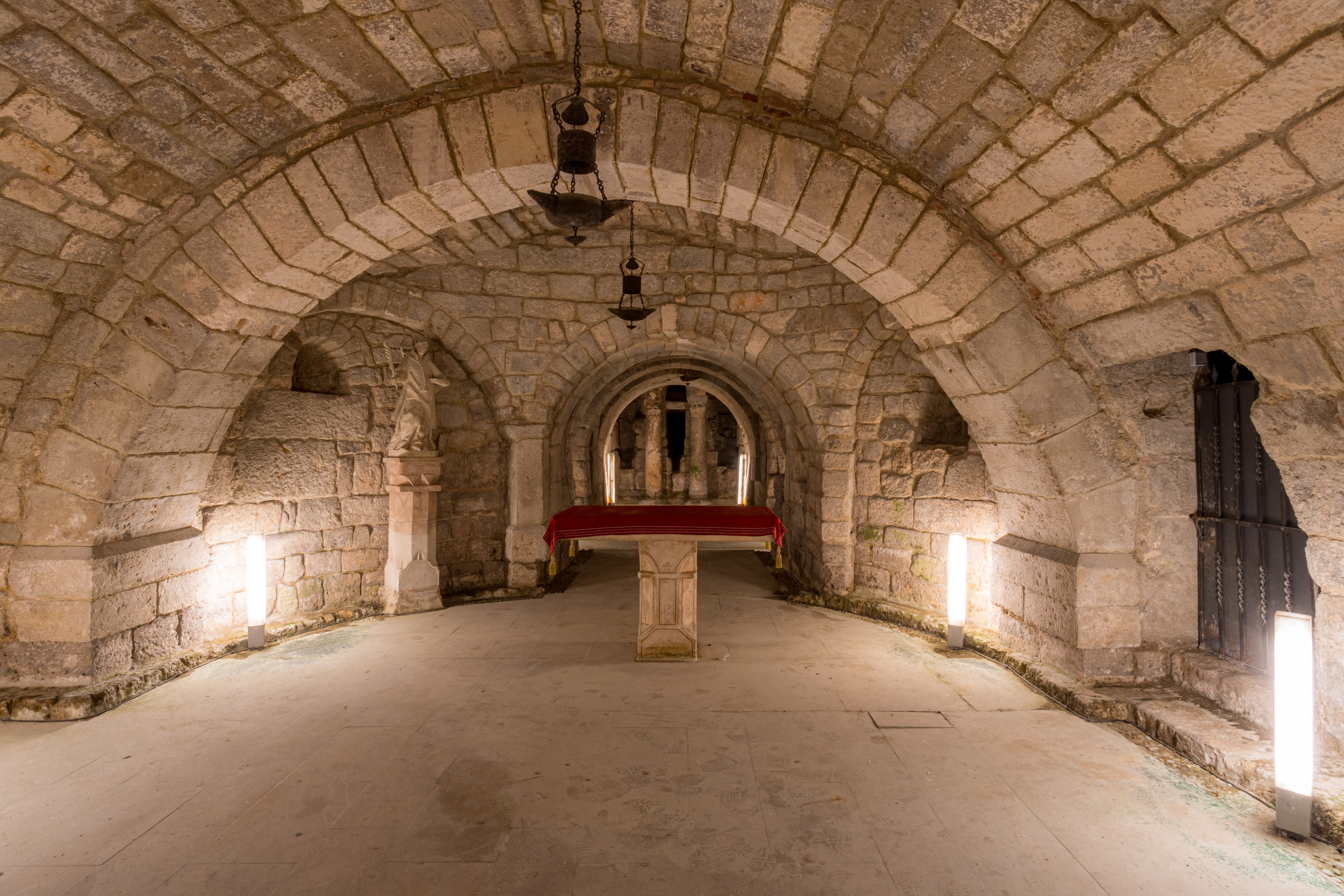
Crypt of Saint Antoninus

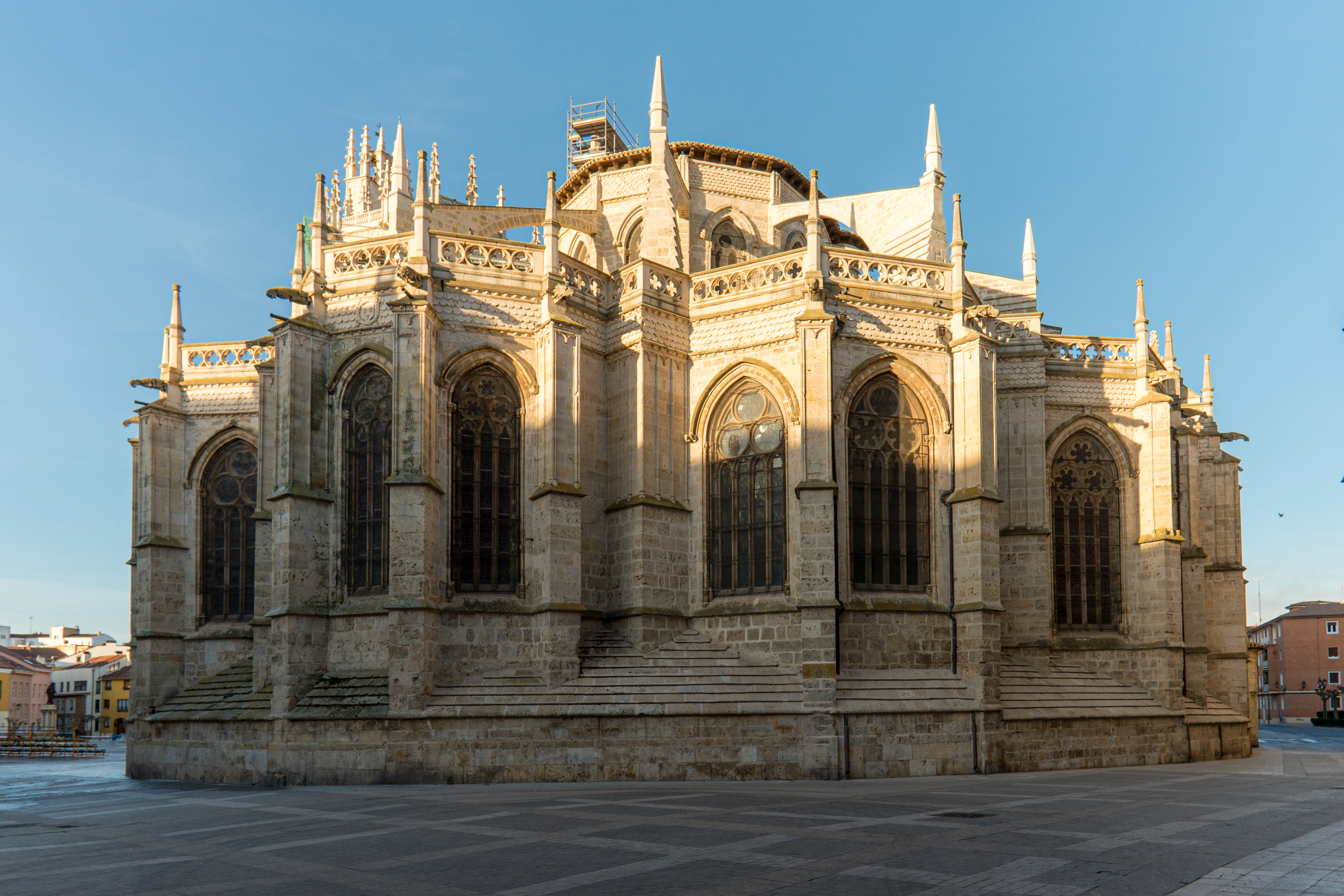
Apse

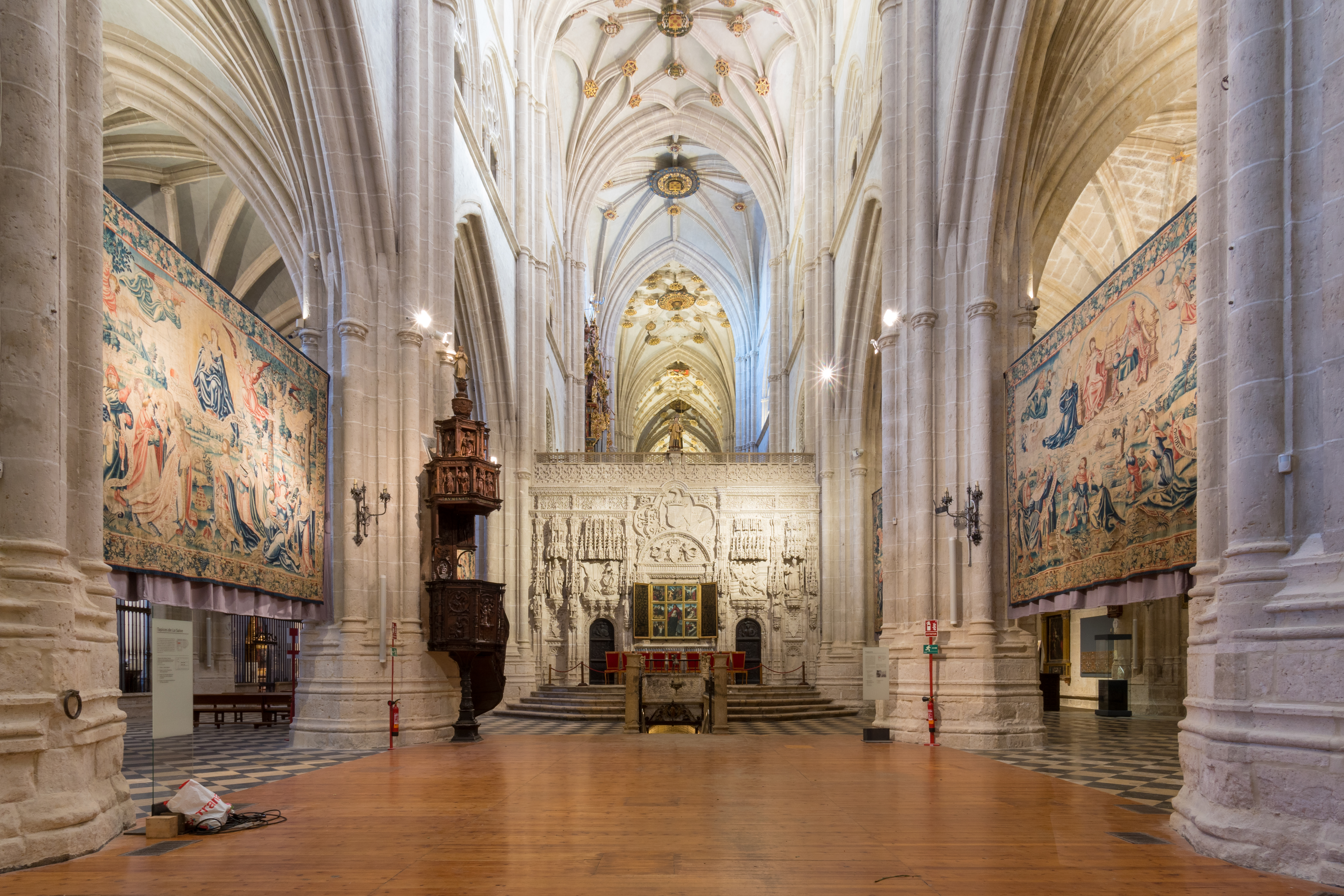
Interior and retrochoir

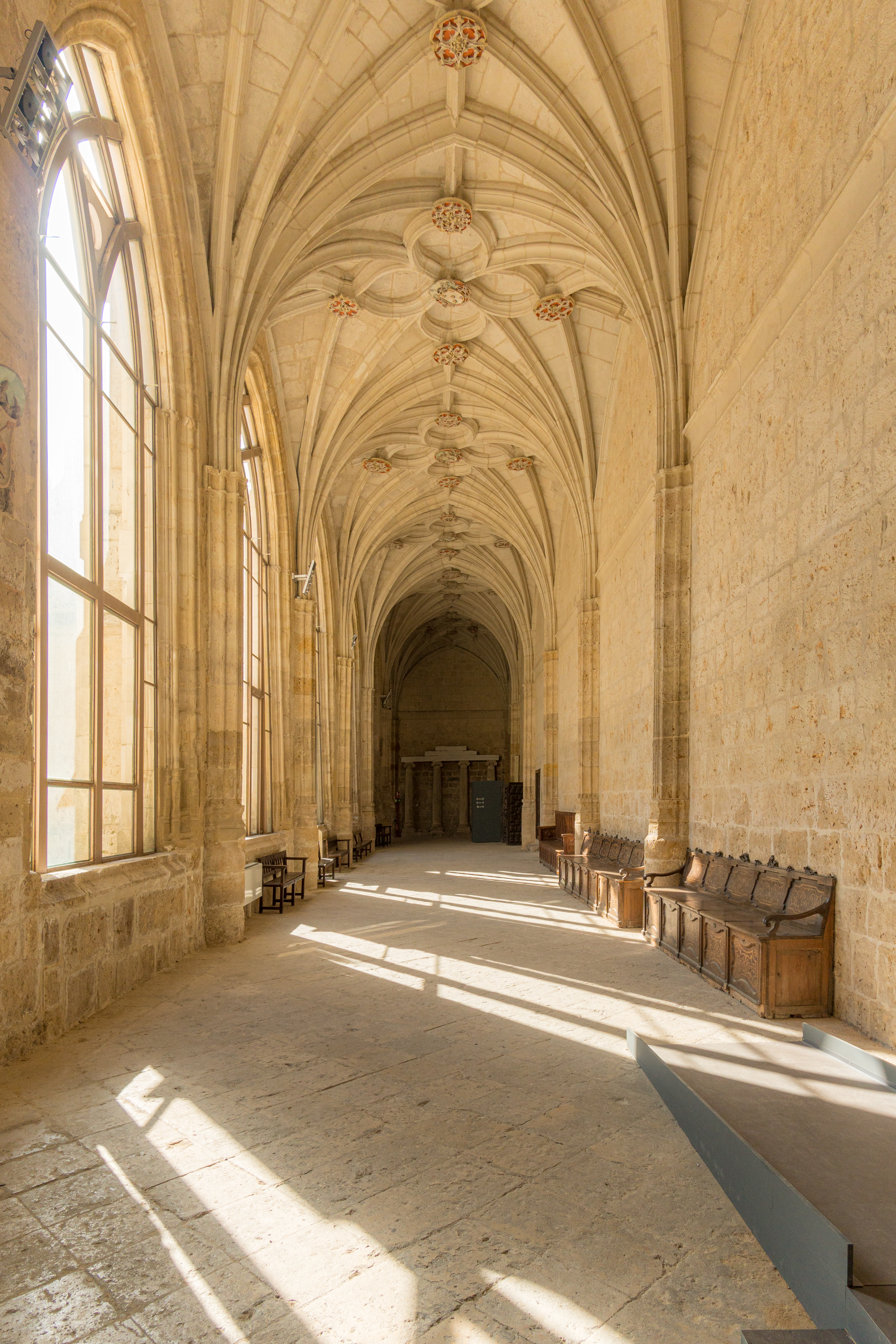
Cloister

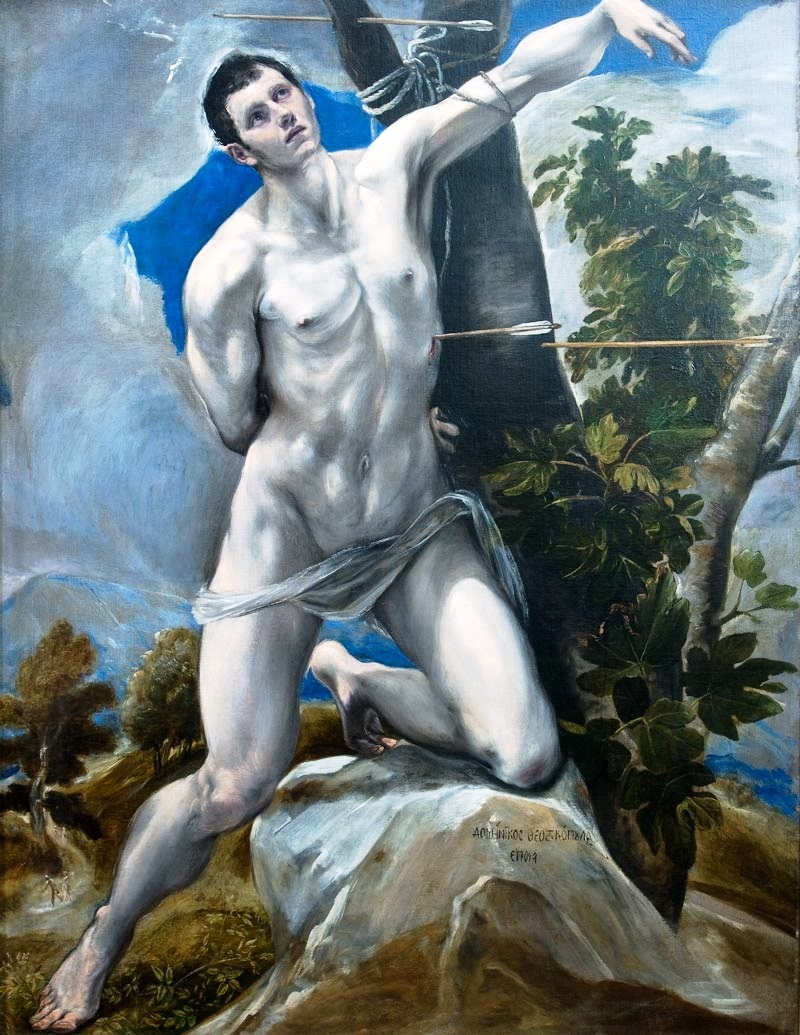
The Martyrdom of Saint Sebastian by El Greco.

== See also ==
- Diocese of Palencia

== Bibliography ==
- Catálogo monumental de Castilla y León. Bienes inmuebles declarados. Vol I. Junta de Castilla y León, 1995. ISBN 84-7846-433-6
- Martínez González, Rafael A. Catedrales de Castilla y León. Catedral de Palencia. Editorial Edilesa, 2002. ISBN 84-8012-387-7
- Navascués Palacio, Pedro; Sarthou Carreres, Carlos (1997). Catedrales de España. Madrid: Espasa Calpe. ISBN 84-239-7645-9. OCLC 249825366.
- Sancho Campo, Ángel. La Catedral de Palencia: un lecho de catedrales. León: Edilesa, 1996. ISBN 84-8012-139-4
- Sancho Campo, Ángel. La Catedral de Palencia: guía breve. León: Edilesa, 2005. ISBN 84-8012-515-2
- Martínez González, Rafael A., "La catedral de Palencia. Historia y arquitectura", Palencia, 1988, ISBN 84-404-1944-9
- CALLE CALLE, Francisco Vicente: Las gárgolas de la Catedral de San Antolín de Palencia, www.bubok.com, 2008.
