= São Sebastião River =

There are two rivers named São Sebastião River in Brazil:

- São Sebastião River (Espírito Santo)
- São Sebastião River (Paraná)

== See also ==
- São Sebastião (disambiguation)
