= Assumption of the Virgin (El Greco) =

Painting by El Greco

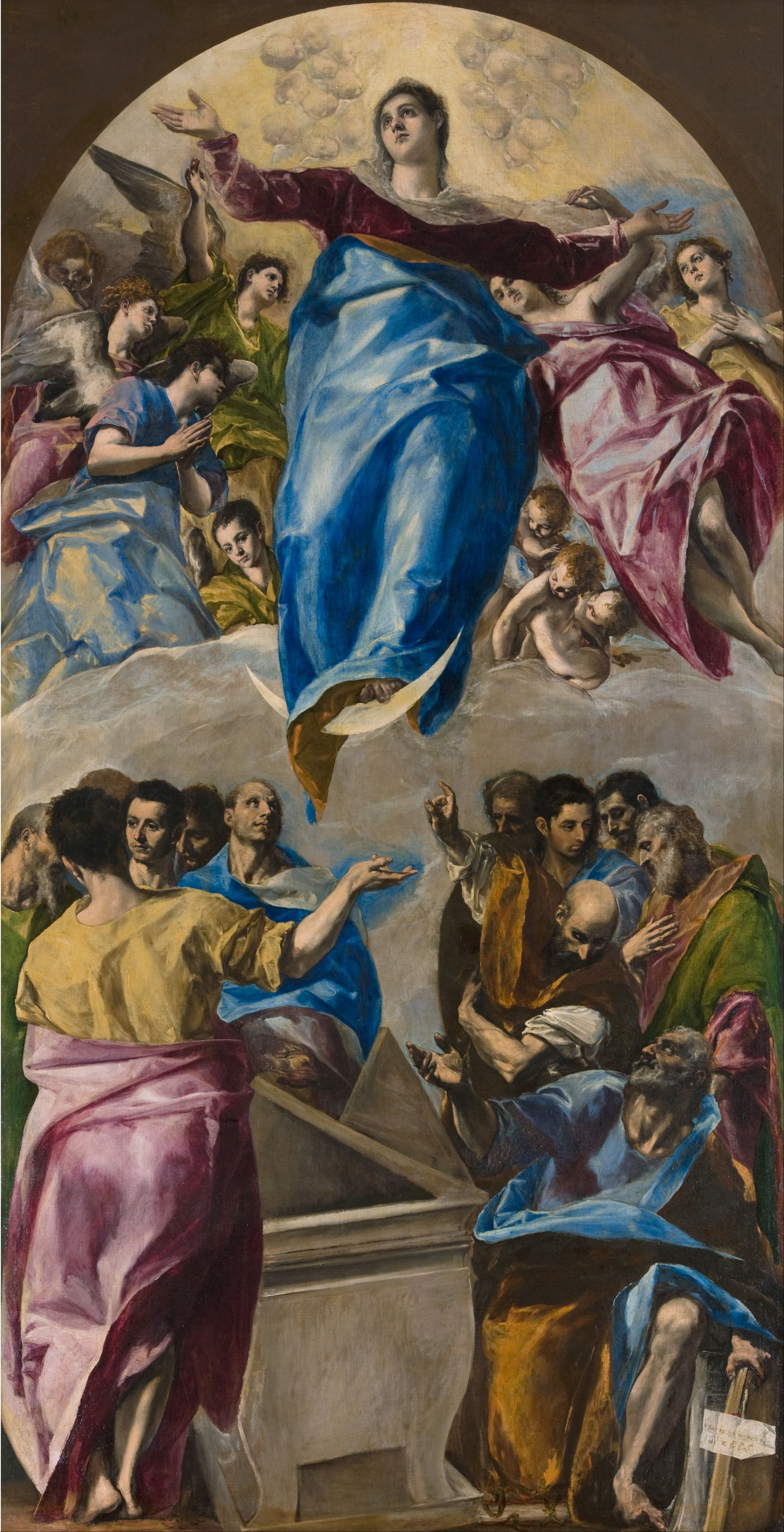
- Artist: El Greco
- Year: 1577-1579
- Medium: Oil on canvas
- Dimensions: 403.2 cm × 211.8 cm (158.7 in × 83.4 in)
- Location: Art Institute of Chicago; Chicago

The Assumption of the Virgin is an oil on canvas painting by Greek artist Doménikos Theotokópoulos, known as El Greco, in 1577–1579. The painting was a central element of the altarpiece of the church of Santo Domingo el Antiguo in Toledo, Spain. It was the first of nine paintings that El Greco was commissioned to paint for this church. The Assumption of the Virgin was El Greco's first work in Toledo and started his 37-year career there. Under the influence of Michelangelo, El Greco created a painting that in essence was Italian, with a naturalistic style, monumental figures, and a Roman school palette. The composition of El Greco's depiction of the Assumption of the Virgin resembles Titian's Assumption in the Basilica dei Frari in Venice with Virgin Mary and angels above and the apostles below. On the painting Virgin Mary floats upward which symbolizes her purity, while apostles gathered around her empty tomb express amazement and concern.

== Virgin Mary in art ==
The Assumption of the Virgin Mary does not appear in the New Testament, but appears in apocryphal literature of the 3rd and 4th centuries, and by 1000 was widely believed in the Western Church, though not made formal Catholic dogma until 1950. It first became a popular subject in Western Christian art in the 12th century, along with other narrative scenes from the Life of the Virgin, and the Coronation of the Virgin. These "Marian" subjects were especially promoted by the Cistercian Order and Saint Bernard of Clairvaux (d. 1153).

Literary accounts with more detail, such as the presence of the Apostles, appeared in late medieval works such as the Golden Legend, and were followed by artists. By the end of the Middle Ages, large and crowded altarpieces gave the artist the opportunity to show his virtuosity in composition, coloring and figure poses. After the Reformation, it was used to assert the Catholic position, rejected by Protestants.

== Provenance ==
The painting was commissioned for the convent church of Santo Domingo el Antiguo in Toledo by Don Diego de Castilla in 1577. The Assumption remained in the church for over 200 years.

Around 1830 the painting was sold to the Infante Don Sebastián Gabriel de Borbón y Braganza in Madrid. In 1835 Spanish government confiscated the painting from him and installed in the Museo Nacional de Trinidad in Madrid, however in 1861, the painting was returned to Don Sebastián. After Don Sebastián's death in 1875, his heirs began to sell works from his collections. The painting was owned by his widow, the Infanta María Cristina de Borbón until her death in 1902, and then was lent by the Infanta's heirs to the Museo del Prado in Madrid in 1902–1904.

In 1904, the American painter Mary Cassatt persuaded the renowned Parisian art dealer Paul Durand–Ruel to purchase the painting, with the financing provided by H. O. Havemeyer. In 1906, the painting was sold to the Art Institute of Chicago.

== See also ==
- List of works by El Greco

== Exhibitions ==
- Pau, Salons of the former Asile de Pau, Paintings belonging to the heirs of the late Msg. the Child don Sébastien de Bourbon and Braganza, September 1876, cat. 668.
- Madrid, Museo Nacional de Pintura y Escultura, Exposición de las obras by Domenico Theotocópouli, llamado El Greco, April 30 - July 31, 1902, cat. 6.
- Art Institute of Chicago, A Century of Progress, June 1 – November 1, 1933, cat. 169, pl. 25.
- Art Institute of Chicago, A Century of Progress, June 1 – November 1, 1934, cat. 70.
- Paris, Grand Palais, Greco, October 14, 2019 – February 10, 2020, cat. 73.
- Art Institute of Chicago, El Greco: Ambition and Defiance, March 7 – June 21, 2020, cat. 14.

== See also ==
- Assumption of the Virgin Mary in art
- Marian art in the Catholic Church
