= Monastery of Saint Dominic of Silos (the Old) =

Cistercian convent in Toledo, Spain

Coordinates: 39.8594°N 4.0287°W

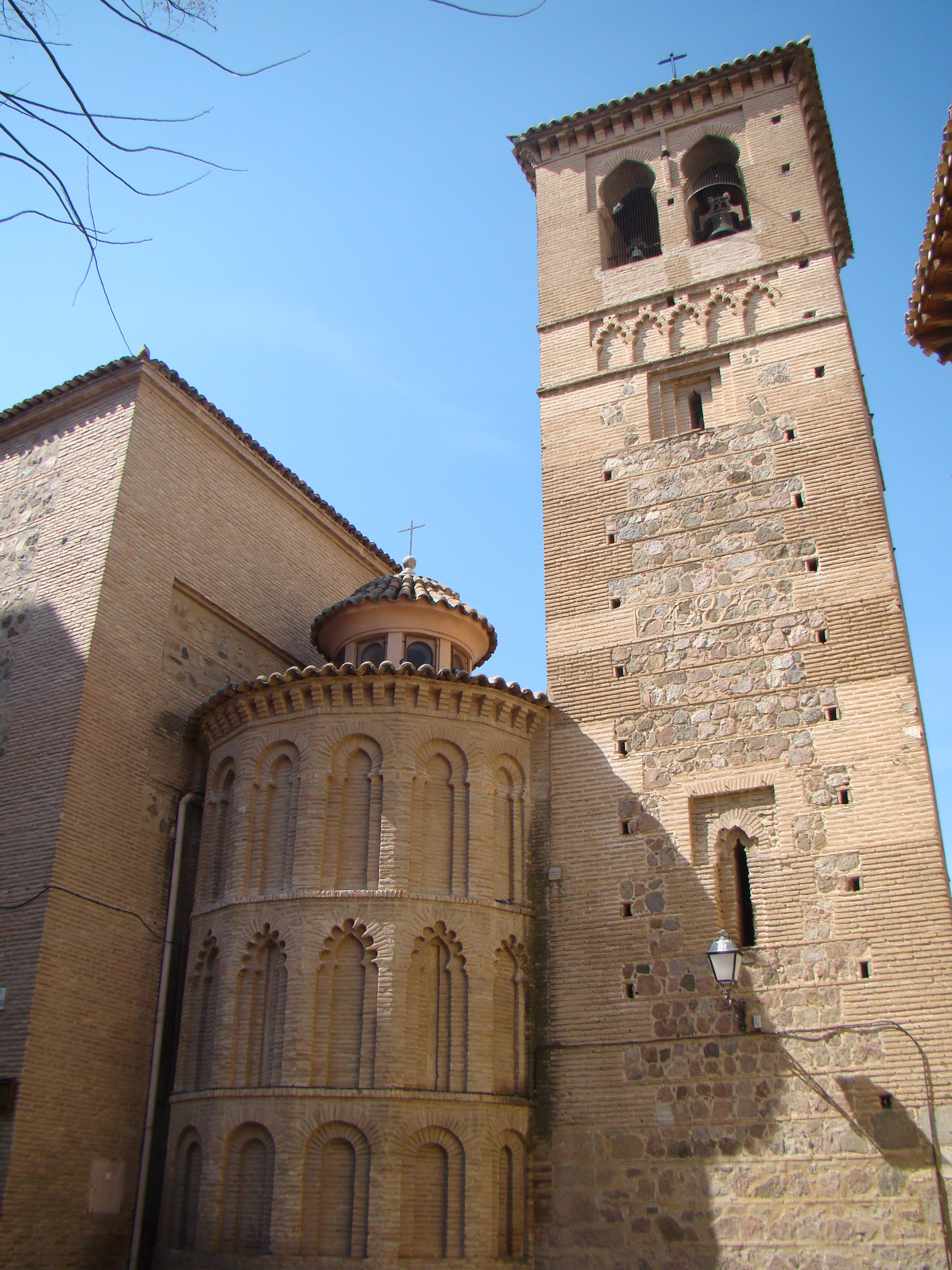
Monasterio de Santo Domingo el Antiguo

The Monastery of Saint Dominic of Silos (the Old) (Spanish: Monasterio de Santo Domingo de Silos (el Antiguo)) is a Cistercian convent in Toledo, Spain.

== History ==
It is believed to have been founded in the 6th century. Its rebuilding after the Conquest of Toledo by King Alfonso VI of Leon and Castile is mentioned by the historian Pedro de Alcocer. King Alfonso had it dedicated to St Dominic of Silos. It was Cluniac before becoming a nunnery of the Cistercian order.

The convent underwent major rebuilding work in the second half of the 16th century, in which the mudéjar church was demolished. The new building was begun by Nicolás de Vergara and completed by the royal architect Juan de Herrera.

== Paintings ==
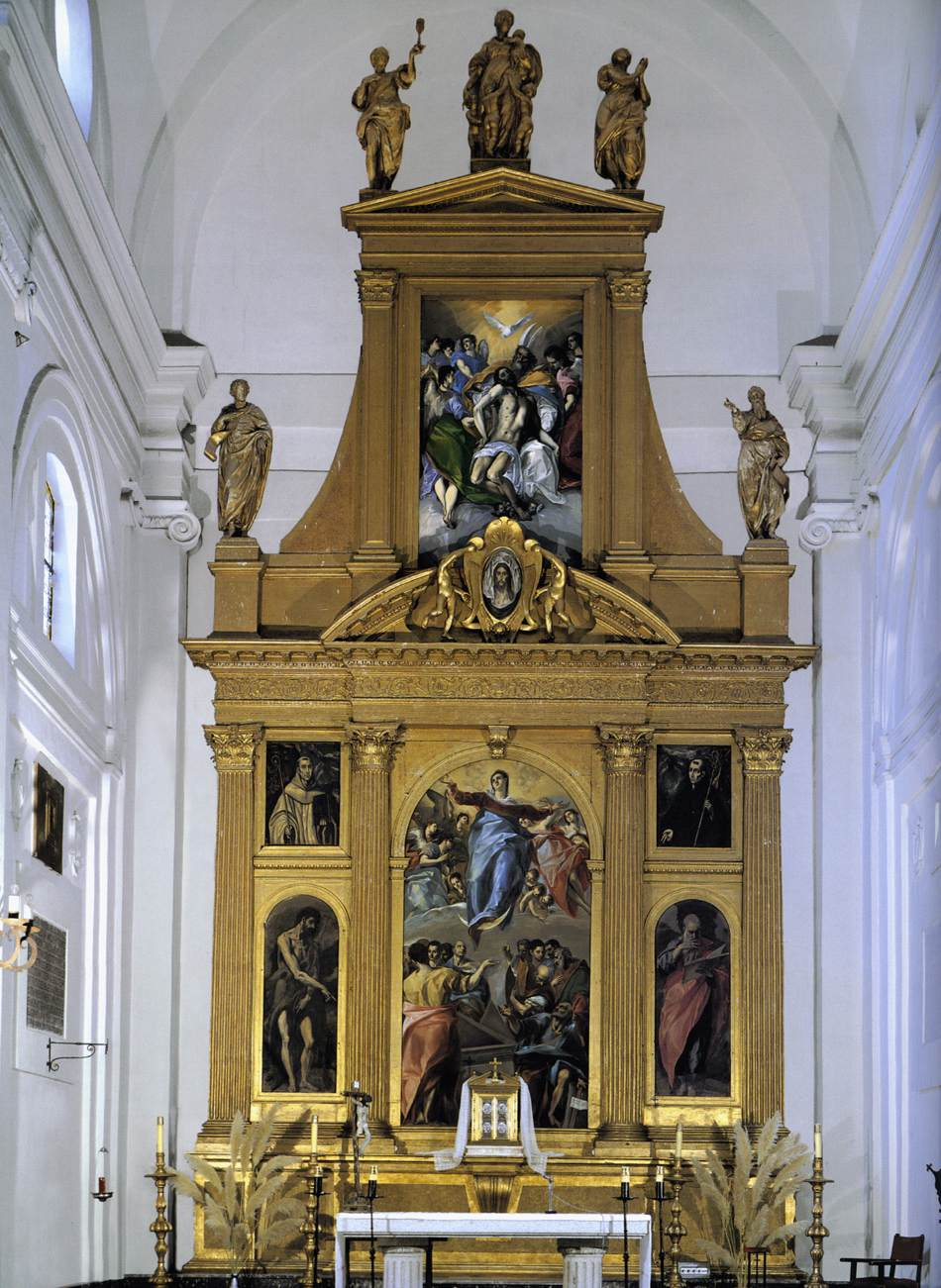
Main altar (retablo)

El Greco settled in Toledo in the 1570s. One of his first commissions in the city, which he gained with the aid of his patron Diego de Castilla, was to provide altarpieces for the convent's church. Some of the component canvases remain in situ, but the main altar now features a replica of the largest of them, The Assumption of the Virgin, which is in the Art Institute of Chicago. Decades later El Greco provided a work intended to hang above his own tomb, The Adoration of the Shepherds (now in the Museo del Prado).

== Conservation ==
The building has the heritage listing Bien de Interés Cultural.
