= Saint-Sébastien =

Saint-Sébastien may refer to:

== France ==
- Saint-Sébastien, Creuse, in the Creuse département
- Saint-Sébastien, Isère, in the Isère département
- Saint-Sébastien-d'Aigrefeuille, in the Gard département
- Saint-Sébastien-de-Morsent, in the Eure département
- Saint-Sébastien-de-Raids, in the Manche département
- Saint-Sébastien-sur-Loire, in the Loire-Atlantique département

== Canada ==
- Saint-Sébastien, Estrie, Quebec, Le Granit, Quebec
- Saint-Sébastien, Montérégie, Quebec, Le Haut-Richelieu, Quebec

== See also ==
- Saint Sebastian (disambiguation)
- San Sebastian (disambiguation)
- Sankt Sebastian, a former municipality in the district of Bruck-Mürzzuschlag in the Austrian province of Styria
