= Saint Sebastian (Ribera, Berlin) =

Lost 1636 oil on canvas painting by Jusepe de Ribera

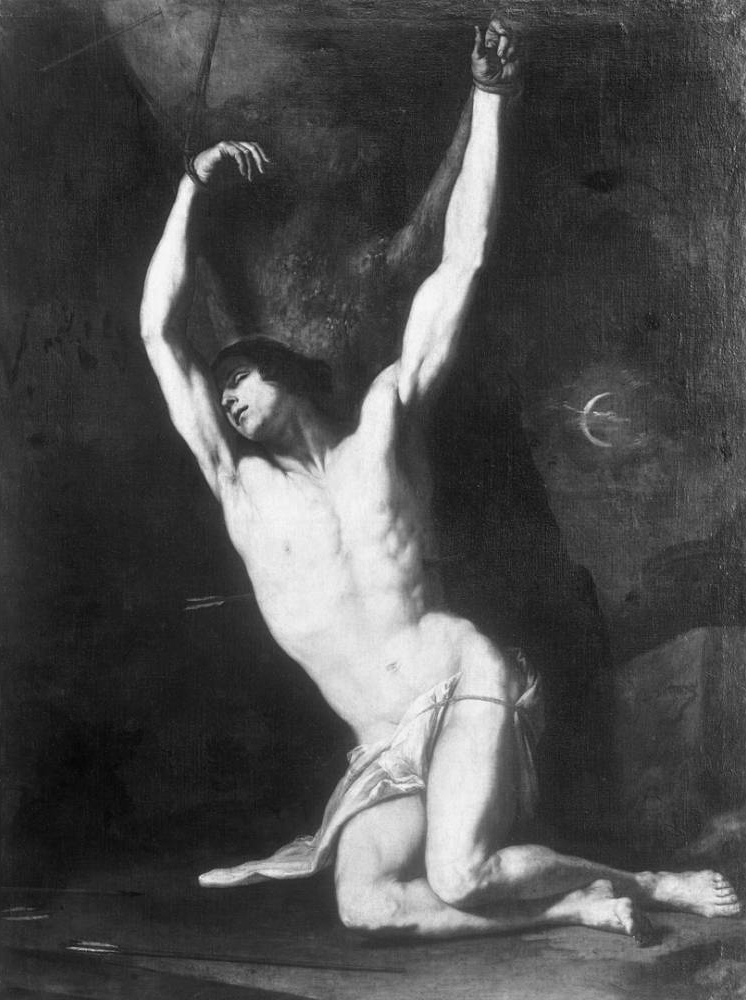

Saint Sebastian was a 1636 oil on canvas painting by Jusepe de Ribera, lost after or more probably in the fire at the Flakturm Friedrichshain in May 1945 or the ensuing looting by Soviet troops.

Its original commissioner and location are debated, though most art historians now believe it was the church of Pasquale Baylón in Madrid. It remained in Edward Solly's private collection until being bought in 1821 by the industrialist Barthold Suermondt. He then owned it until 1874, when the Gemäldegalerie acquired it. It was later moved to the Kaiser-Friedrich-Museum and then on the outbreak of the Second World War to the Flakturm Friedrichshain.
