= Saint Sebastian (Kubišta) =

Painting by Bohumil Kubišta

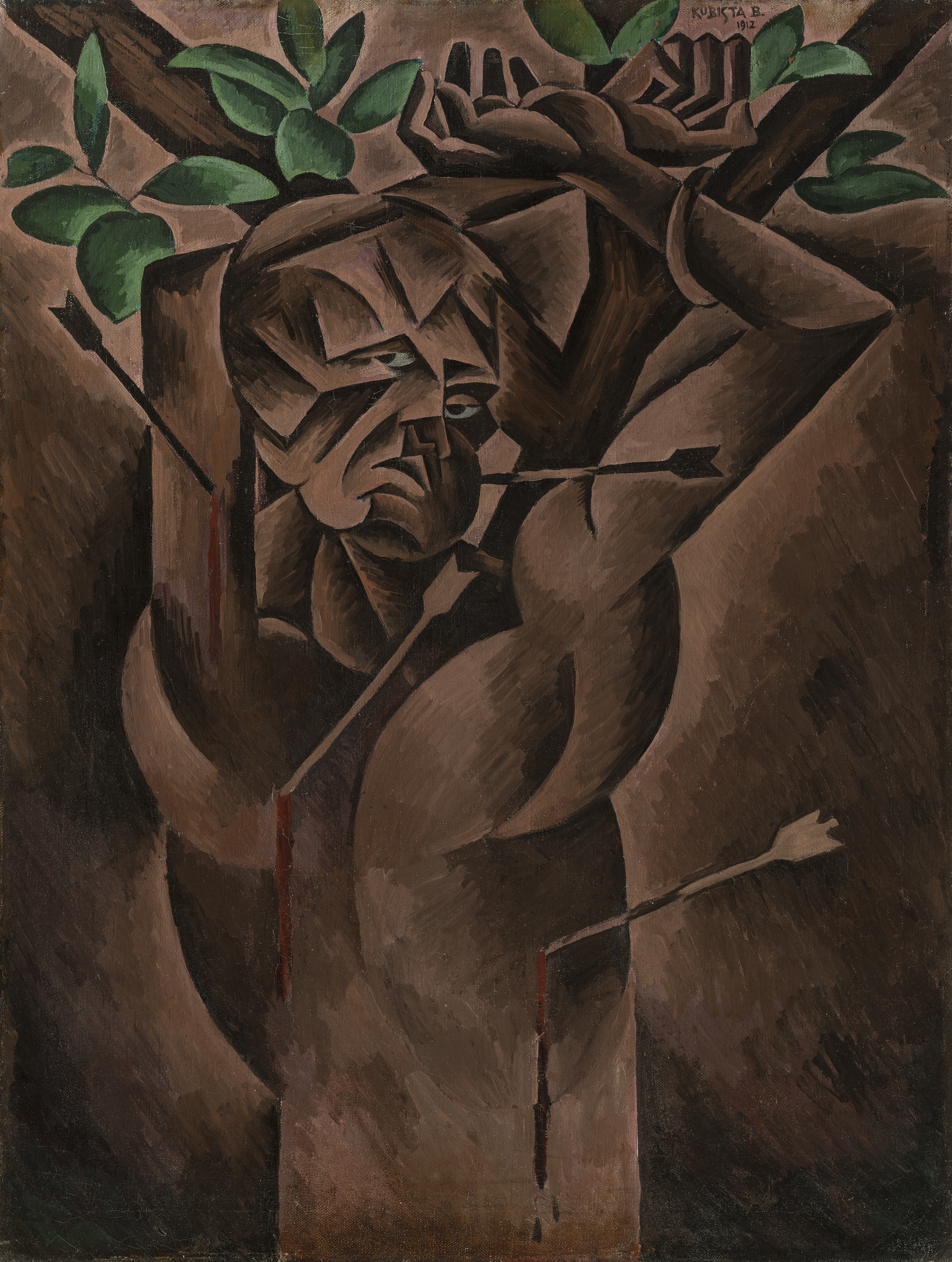
St Sebastian (Bohumil Kubishta painting)

Saint Sebastian is a 1912 oil-on-canvas painting by Czech artist Bohumil Kubišta. The work depicts the Christian martyr Saint Sebastian and is held in the National Gallery in Prague. It is considered one of Kubišta's most important works and reflects his synthesis of Cubist structure with expressive and symbolic elements.

The picture is painted in oils on canvas and measures 98 × 74.5 cm. It is one of the most important works of Bohumil Kubishta, a member of the pre–First World War Czech avant-garde. Unlike traditional Christian interpretations of the theme of the suffering of the Christian martyr, Kubishta combines cubist forms and expressiveness while integrating spiritual strength.

== Description ==
The painting portrays Saint Sebastian, a Christian martyr traditionally depicted bound and pierced by arrows. Kubišta’s interpretation departs from conventional representations by employing angular, geometric forms associated with Cubism, combined with expressive use of colour and composition. The work emphasises spiritual resilience rather than physical suffering.

== Background and style ==
Bohumil Kubista was a leading figure in the Czech avant-garde of the early 20th century and a founding member of the group Osma. His work around 1911–1912 reflects the influence of both Expressionism and Cubism, integrating geometric structure with emotional intensity. ''Saint Sebastian'' exemplifies this synthesis, distinguishing his approach from that of French Cubists.

== Significance ==
The painting is regarded as one of Kubišta’s key works and an important example of early Czech modernism prior to the First World War.
