= San Sebastián, Quito =

San Sebastián
- Electoral parish
- Location in Ecuador
- Coordinates: 0.2333°S 78.5167°W
- Country: Ecuador
- Province: Pichincha
- Canton: Quito
- Established: October 2004
- Time zone: UTC−5 (ECT)

San Sebastián is an electoral parish (parroquia electorale urban) or district of Quito, the second most populous city in Ecuador. The parish was established as a result of the October 2004 political elections when the city was divided into 19 urban electoral parishes.
