= Saint Sebastian (Reni, Dulwich) =

Painting by Guido Reni

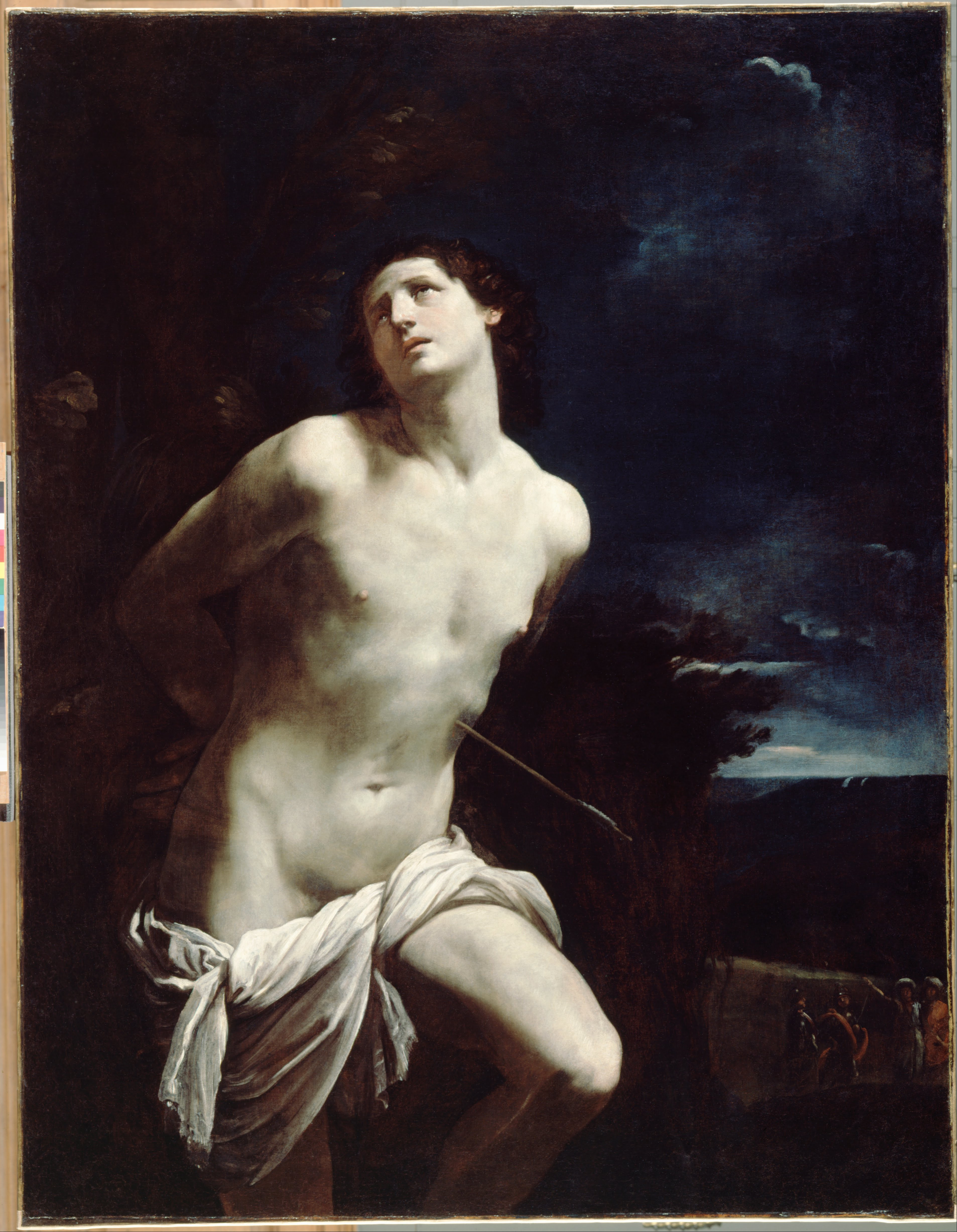
- Artist: Guido Reni
- Dimensions: 170 cm × 131 cm (67 in × 52 in)
- Location: Dulwich Picture Gallery, London

Saint Sebastian is an oil on canvas painting of Saint Sebastian, now in the Dulwich Picture Gallery. It was worked on by Guido Reni himself from 1620 to 1639 but left unfinished. It is almost identical to another copy of the work in Auckland, though that work is much smaller and has slightly different colouring. The Dulwich work was catalogued as a studio work in 1880 and in 1980 as a copy, but is now accepted as one of two autograph copies of the original.
