= Diego de Castilla =

Spanish cleric

Diego de Castilla (1510/15 – 1584) was a Spanish cleric who served as dean of Toledo Cathedral. He was a patron of the painter El Greco.

== Family ==
Castilla inherited the position of dean of Toledo on the death of his father in 1545. Castilla was of Jewish blood, and this became a major issue for him in 1547, when Juan Martínez Silíceo the archbishop of Toledo, passed a statute of cleanliness of blood, excluding from ecclesiastical office and benefices anyone with a trace of Jewish lineage over four generations. Therefore, Castilla developed an obsession for genealogy, working tirelessly to prove his family's links to Spain's medieval kings.

== Patron of the arts ==
On 2 July 1577, El Greco was formally engaged by Diego de Castilla to paint three altarpieces for the church of a Cistercian convent, the Monastery of Santo Domingo el Antiguo in Toledo. The main altarpiece included images of the Assumption of the Virgin and The Trinity, subjects of central theological importance. Mark Irving regards these commissions as "a public declaration that he, a leading national figure in the battle against the Protestant heresy, could be trusted to support the theological argument of the Catholic church".

El Greco also undertook the renowned El Espolio as a commission from Castilla.
