= The Disrobing of Christ =

16th-century painting by El Greco

- El Expolio (Spanish)
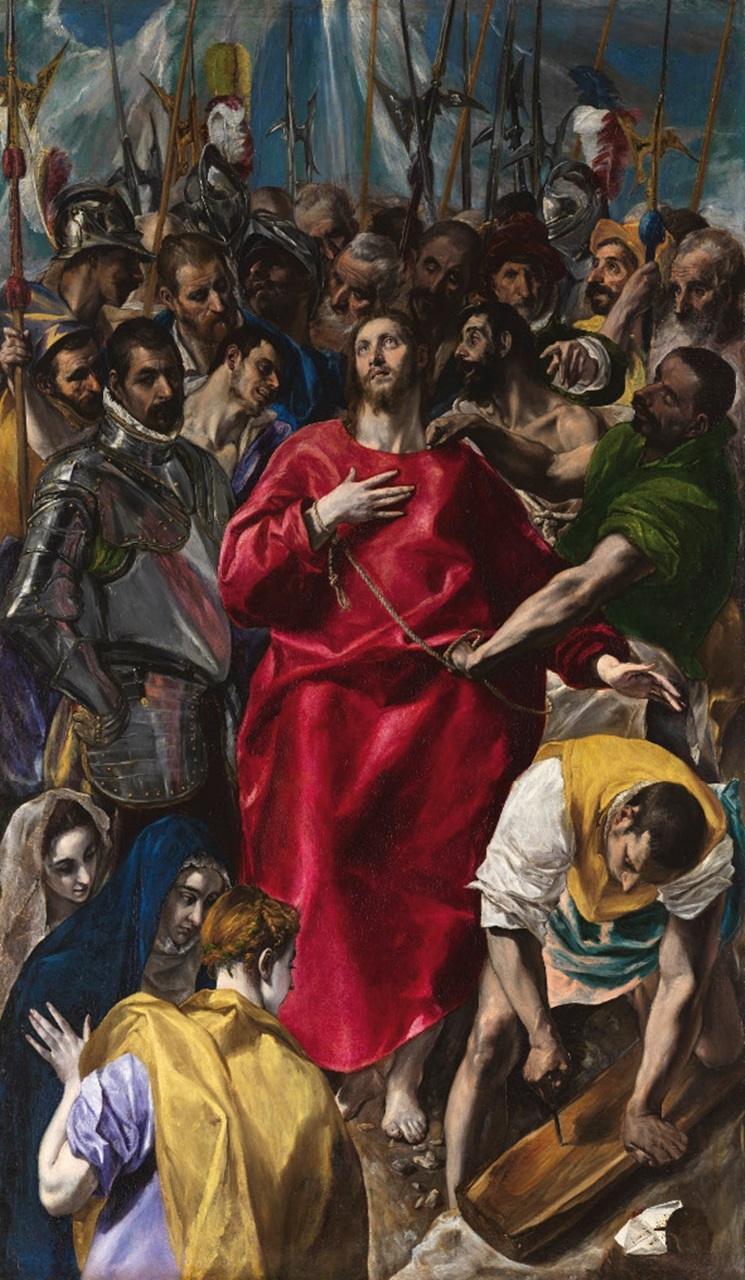
- Artist: El Greco
- Year: 1577–1579
- Medium: oil on canvas
- Dimensions: 285 cm × 173 cm (112 in × 68 in)
- Location: Sacristy of Toledo Cathedral

The Disrobing of Christ or El Expolio (Latin: Exspolĭum) is a painting by El Greco begun in the summer of 1577 and completed in the spring of 1579 for the High Altar of the sacristy of the Cathedral of Toledo, where it still normally hangs. In late 2013 it was on temporary display at the Prado in Madrid (with the other El Grecos), following a period of cleaning and conservation work there; it was returned to Toledo in 2014. It is one of El Greco's most famous works. A document dated July 2, 1577 which refers to this painting is the earliest record of El Greco's presence in Spain. The commission for the painting was secured thanks to El Greco's friendship from Rome with Luis, the son of Diego de Castilla, the dean of the Cathedral of Toledo. De Castilla senior also arranged El Greco's other major commission, on which he worked simultaneously, the paintings for the Toledan church of Santo Domingo el Antiguo.

== Description ==
The painting shows Christ looking up to Heaven with an expression of serenity; His idealized figure seems segregated from the other people and the violence surrounding him. A figure dressed in black in the background points at Christ accusingly, while two others argue over who will have His garments. A man in green to Christ's left holds Him firmly with a rope and is about to rip off His robe in preparation for his crucifixion. At the lower right, a man in yellow bends over the cross and drills a hole to facilitate the insertion of a nail to be driven through Christ's feet. The radiant face of the Savior is violently juxtaposed to the coarse figures of the executioners, who are amassed around Him creating an impression of disturbance with their movements, their gestures and lances.

Christ is clad in a bright red robe, the focal point of the work. The purple garment (a metonymic symbol of the divine passion) appears sparingly; the yellow and blue in the foreground come secondary to the striking red hue.

In the left foreground, the three Marys contemplate the scene with distress. Their presence was objected to by the Cathedral authorities, since they are not mentioned as present at this point in the Gospels. Greco probably took this detail, with some others like the rope around Christ's wrists, from the account in the Meditations on the Passion of Jesus Christ by Saint Bonaventure. The placement of the tormentors higher than the head of Christ also was cited by the commissioners of the Cathedral in the arbitration process over the price.

In designing the composition vertically and compactly in the foreground El Greco seems to have been motivated by the desire to show the oppression of Christ by his cruel tormentors. The figure of Christ, robust, tall and tranquil, dominates the center of the composition which is built vertically like a wall. El Greco chose a method of space elimination that is common to middle and late 16th-century Mannerists. According to Harold Wethey, El Greco "probably recalled late Byzantine paintings in which the superposition of heads row upon row is employed to suggest a crowd".

== Critical analysis ==
Wethey regards the painting as a "masterpiece of extraordinary originality". The powerful effect of the painting especially depends upon his original and forceful use of colour. Something of the effect of the grand images of the Saviour in Byzantine art is recalled; by this date the disrobing was a rare subject in Western art. The motif of the crowding round Christ suggests an acquaintance with the works of Northern artists, like Bosch (the best collection of whose works belonged to Philip II); the figure preparing the Cross could be derived from the similar figure bending forward in Raphael's tapestry and cartoon of the Miraculous Draught of Fishes, which he would have known from Rome. This is, however, the last time that there are any hints of specific borrowings. The original altar of gilded wood that El Greco designed for the painting has been destroyed, but his small sculpted group of the Miracle of St. Ildefonso still survives on the lower center of the frame.

== Arbitration ==
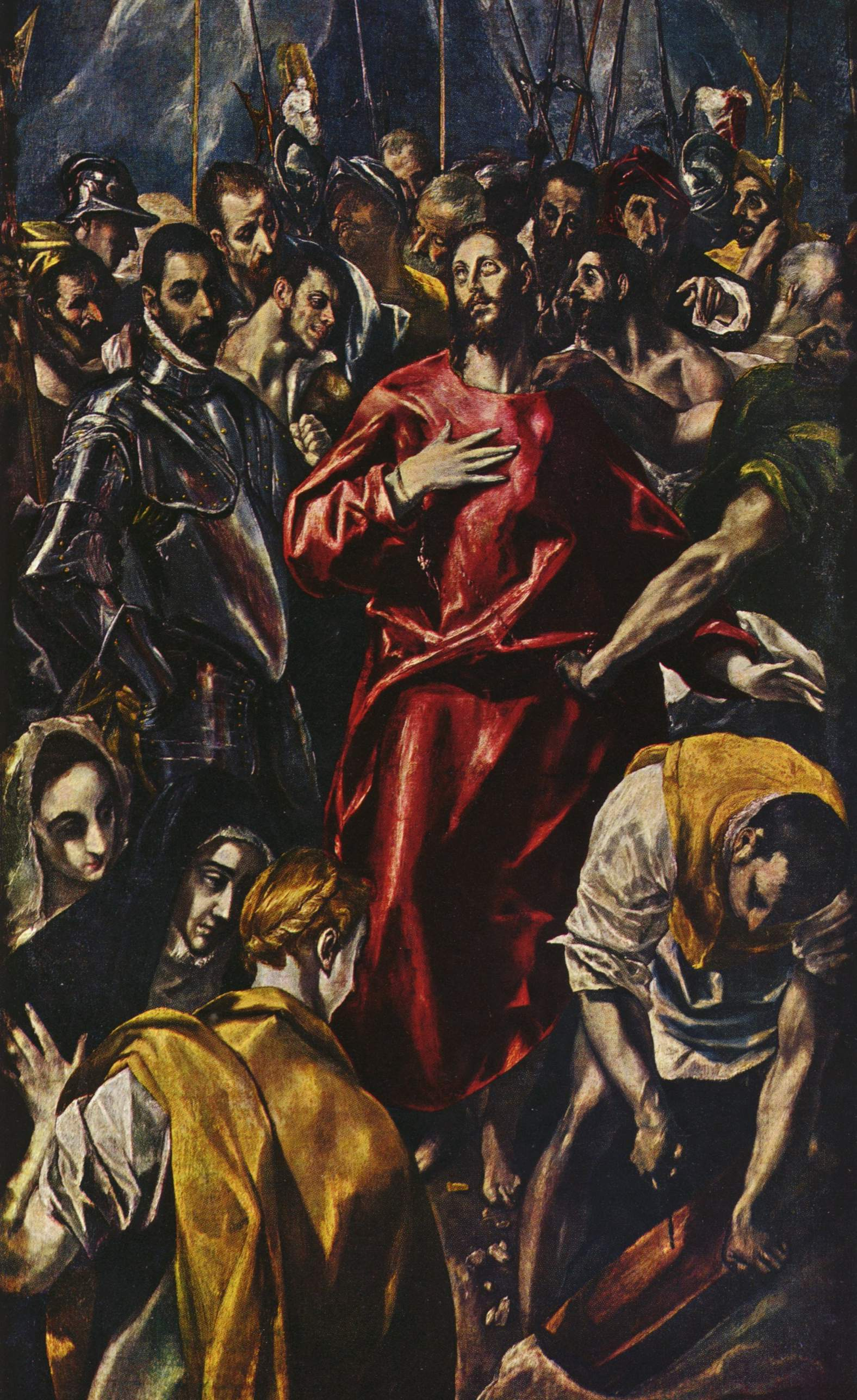
The Munich variant.

The Disrobing of Christ was a subject of a dispute between the painter and the representatives of the Cathedral regarding the price of the work; El Greco was forced to have recourse to legal arbitration and eventually received only 350 ducats, when his own appraiser had valued it at 950. He was also supposed to remove some of the figures objected to, which he never did.

== Variants ==
Despite the complaints of the commissioners of the Cathedral the painting was hugely successful; currently, more than 17 versions of the painting are known. Two greatly reduced versions are generally accepted as from the hand of El Greco himself; possibly one may have been an oil sketch study, or, more likely, a studio record of the composition. Other replica versions may also be in whole or part by the master himself. A 1581-1586 autograph or studio copy has been in the Museum of Fine Arts of Lyon since 1886.

A c.1600 variant of the work is in the National Gallery in Oslo, Norway — this is attributed to the artist. Another in the Alte Pinakothek, Munich is thought to be an autograph preparatory sketch for the main work.

A version is also on display at Upton House in Warwickshire, England.

== See also ==
- List of works by El Greco

== Sources ==
- Brown, Jonathan (ed.) (1982). "El Greco and Toledo", El Greco of Toledo (catalogue). Little Brown. ISBN 978-0-8212-1506-7
- Clark, Kenneth. Looking at Pictures. New York: Holt Rinehart and Winston, 1960
