= Saint Sebastian (Reni, Auckland) =

Painting by Guido Reni

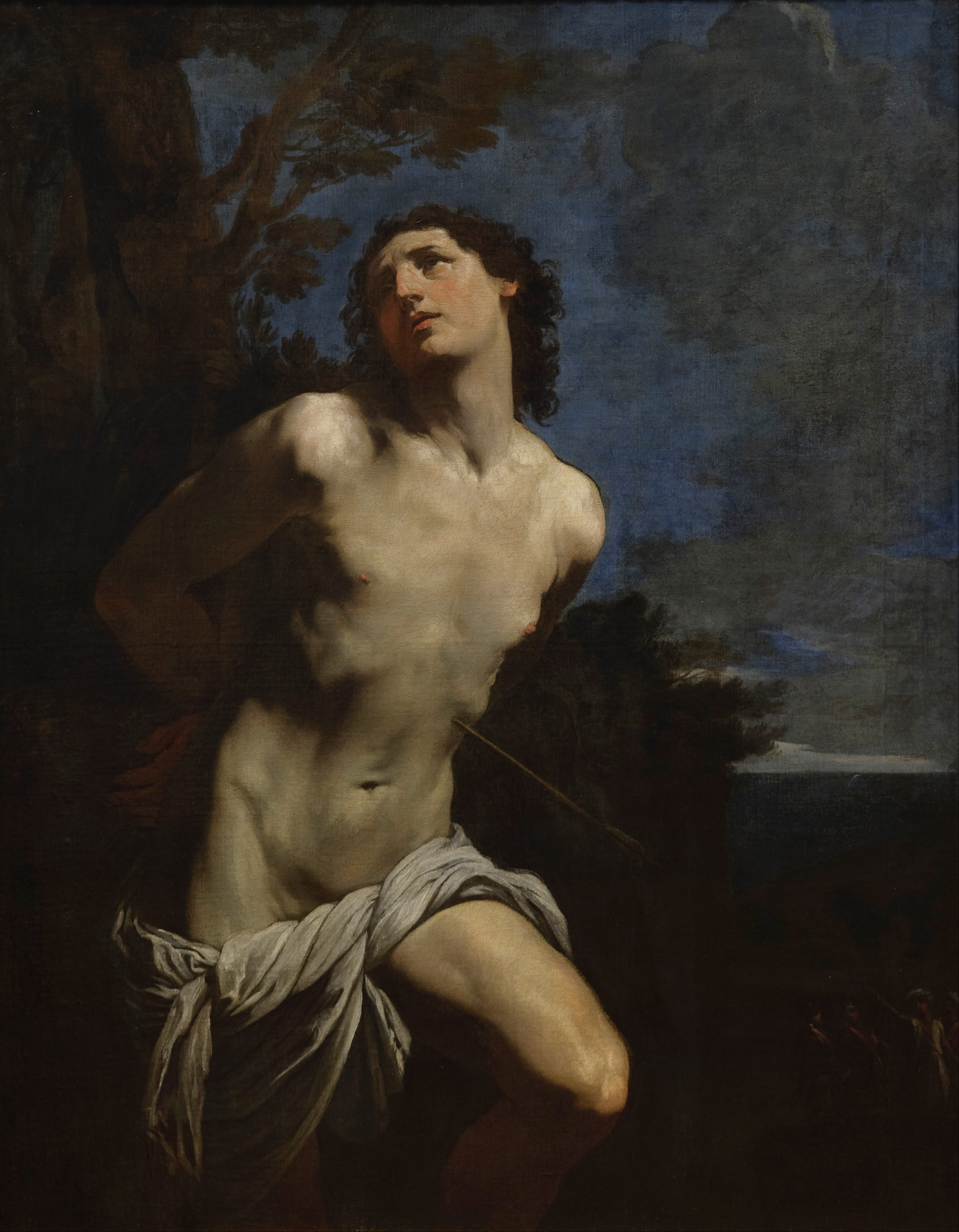
- Artist: Guido Reni
- Year: c.1625
- Medium: oil on canvas
- Dimensions: 76 cm × 61 cm (30 in × 24 in)
- Location: Auckland Art Gallery, Auckland

Saint Sebastian is a c.1625 oil on canvas painting of Saint Sebastian by Guido Reni. It was previously in the private collection of the Dukes of Hamilton, from which it was sold to its present owner, Auckland Art Gallery in New Zealand.

Reni painted the subject several times - this example is closest to the others now in Bologna, Madrid, Paris and Puerto Rico, with a pose drawn from Michelangelo's Rebellious Slave, although it also has differences to them - the left hand is shown, the loincloth is smaller and some figures have been added to the landscape background.

An almost identical copy, worked on by Reni himself from 1620 to 1639 but left unfinished, is now in the Dulwich Picture Gallery in London. The copy has slightly different colouring and is much larger, at 1.7 by 1.31 m.
