= Saint Sebastian (El Greco, 1610–1614) =

Painting by El Greco

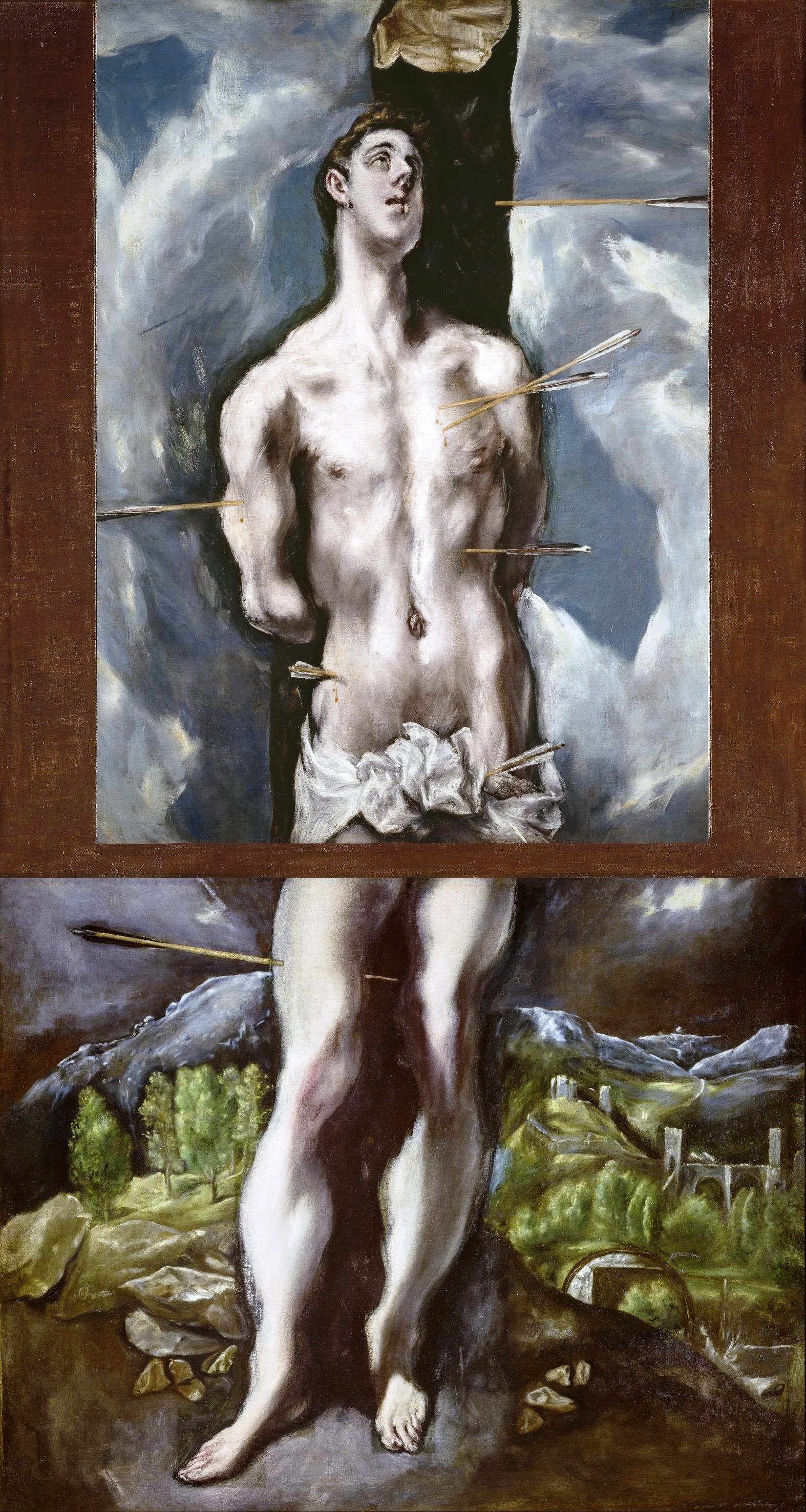
- Artist: El Greco
- Year: c. 1610-1614
- Medium: oil on canvas
- Dimensions: 201.5 cm × 111.5 cm (79.3 in × 43.9 in)
- Location: Museo del Prado, Madrid

Saint Sebastian is a 1610–1614 oil on canvas painting by El Greco, the last of his three portrayals of Saint Sebastian. It survives in two large fragments, both of which are in the Prado Museum; the top half was donated by the Countess of Mora y Aragón in 1959 and the lower half was acquired in 1987.

According to legend, Saint Sebastian was a 3rd-century soldier in the Roman Praetorian Guard who was sentenced to death for inciting his fellow soldiers to die rather than renounce their Christian beliefs as required by the then Emperor Diocletian. The subject was popular with artists as it gave an opportunity to portray the male nude in a dramatic way.

Typically of El Greco's later work the figure of Sebastian, particularly the neck, has been elongated for dramatic effect. He is looking heavenwards as if in quiet anticipation. The background includes a view of the town of Toledo, with which Sebastian had no connection, possibly at the request of his patron or to create an artificial association between the saint and the city.

== See also ==
- List of works by El Greco
- Saint Sebastian (El Greco, 1576-1579)

== Bibliography (in Spanish) ==
- ÁLVAREZ LOPERA, José, El Greco, Madrid, Arlanza, 2005, Biblioteca «Descubrir el Arte», (colección «Grandes maestros»). ISBN 84-9550-344-1.
- SCHOLZ-HÄNSEL, Michael, El Greco, Colonia, Taschen, 2003. ISBN 978-3-8228-3173-1.
- ArteHistoria.com. «San Sebastián». [Consulta: 29.05.2011].
