= Sankt Sebastian =

- Municipality
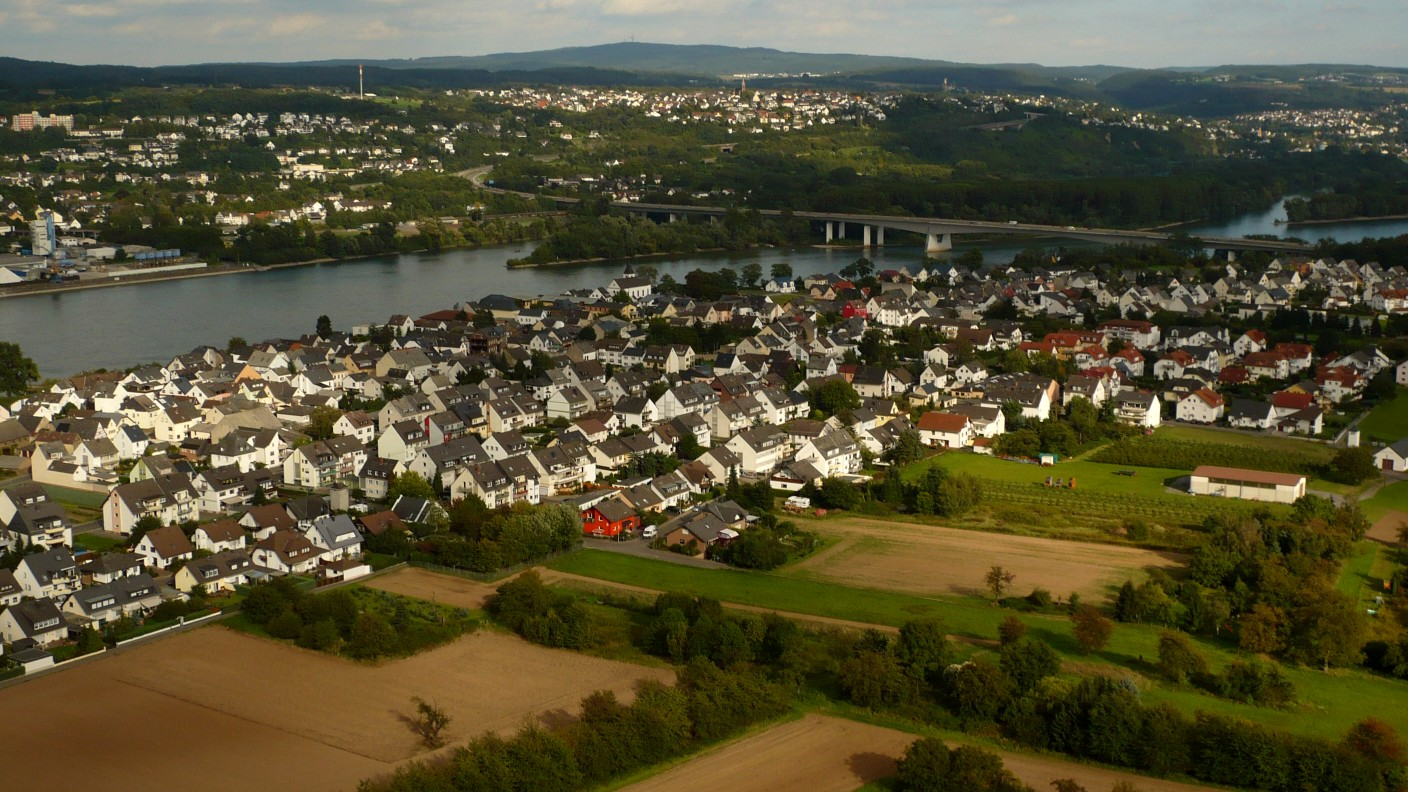
- Aerial view

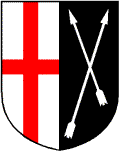
- Coat of arms

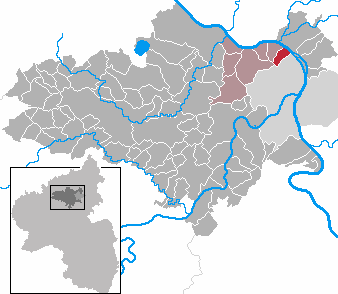
- Location of Sankt Sebastian within Mayen-Koblenz district
- Interactive map of Sankt Sebastian
- Location within Germany Location within Rhineland-Palatinate
- Coordinates: 50°24′44″N 7°33′48″E
- Country: Germany
- State: Rhineland-Palatinate
- District: Mayen-Koblenz
- Municipal assoc.: Weißenthurm

Government
  - Mayor (2019–24): Marco Seidl

Area
  - Total: 2.88 km^{2} (1.11 sq mi)
- Elevation: 69 m (226 ft)

Population (2025-12-31)
  - Total: 2,641
  - Density: 917/km^{2} (2,380/sq mi)
- Time zone: UTC+01:00 (CET)
  - Summer (DST): UTC+02:00 (CEST)
- Postal codes: 56220
- Dialling codes: 0261
- Vehicle registration: MYK
- Website: www.sankt-sebastian.de

Sankt Sebastian (German pronunciation: [zaŋkt zeˈbasti̯a(ː)n]) is a municipality in the district of Mayen-Koblenz in Rhineland-Palatinate, western Germany.
