= San Sebastian (disambiguation) =

San Sebastián is a city in the Basque Country, Spain.

San Sebastián or San Sebastian may also refer to:

== Places ==
=== Spain ===
- San Sebastián (Morcín), a parish in Morcín, Asturias
- San Sebastián de Garabandal, a village in the municipality of Rionansa, Cantabria
- San Sebastián de La Gomera, a town in the Canary Islands
- San Sebastián de los Ballesteros, a municipality in the province of Córdoba, Andalusia
- San Sebastián de los Reyes, a city in the Community of Madrid

=== Guatemala ===
- San Sebastián, Retalhuleu
- San Sebastián Coatán
- San Sebastián Huehuetenango

=== Mexico ===
- San Sebastián del Oeste, a town and municipality in Jalisco, Mexico
- San Sebastián, Etzatlán, a locality in Etzatlán municipality, Jalisco, Mexico
- San Sebastián Tlacotepec, Puebla
- San Sebastian, Sinaloa, a place in Sinaloa, Mexico

==== Oaxaca ====
- San Sebastián Abasolo
- San Sebastián Coatlán
- San Sebastián Ixcapa
- San Sebastián Nicananduta
- San Sebastián Río Hondo
- San Sebastián Tecomaxtlahuaca
- San Sebastián Teitipac
- San Sebastián Tutla

=== United States ===
- San Sebastian River, a tidal channel which flows into Matanzas Bay in Florida, US
- Sebastian, Florida, a city in Indian River County, Florida, US
- San Sebastián, Puerto Rico, a municipality in Puerto Rico

=== Philippines ===
- San Sebastian, Samar, a municipality
- San Sebastian, a district of Tarlac City

=== Colombia ===
- San Sebastián de Urabá, an abandoned settlement
- San Sebastián, Cauca, Department of Cauca
- San Sebastián de Buenavista, Department of Magdalena, Colombia

=== Elsewhere ===
- San Sebastián, Aragua, a city in Venezuela
- San Sebastián, Tierra del Fuego, a settlement in Tierra del Fuego, Argentina
  - San Sebastián Airport (Chile)
  - San Sebastián Bay, Argentina
- San Sebastián, Comayagua, a municipality in Honduras
- San Sebastian, Lempira, a municipality in Honduras
- San Sebastián, San Vicente, a municipality in El Salvador
- San Sebastián, Quito, an electoral parish of Quito, Ecuador
- San Sebastián District, Cusco, in Cusco Province, Peru
- San Sebastián (district), a district of San José canton in Costa Rica

== Music ==
- San Sebastian (band), a rock band from Hamilton, Ontario, Canada
- "San Sebastian (Revisited)", a song by Sonata Arctica from their 2001 album Silence
- "San Sebastian", a song by Alien Ant Farm from their 2006 album Up in the Attic

== Other uses ==
- Saint Sebastian, an early Christian saint and martyr
- San Sebastián, Toledo, one of the oldest churches of Toledo, Spain
- San Sebastian Church (Manila), a Neo-Gothic church in Manila, Philippines
- Clásica de San Sebastián, a bicycle race
- San Sebastian College – Recoletos, an institution for higher learning in Manila, Philippines
  - San Sebastian Stags, varsity teams of the college
- Siege of San Sebastián, a siege during the Peninsular War in 1813
- San Sebastián, a ship commanded by Francisco de Cortés Hojea on a 1557 expedition to explore Patagonia
- San Sebastian (horse), a British Thoroughbred racehorse

== See also ==
- 2015 San Sebastián del Oeste ambush, where 15 policemen were killed
- USS St. Sebastian (SP-470), a United States Navy patrol vessel 1917–1919
- Saint-Sébastien (disambiguation)
