= Sebastian (name) =

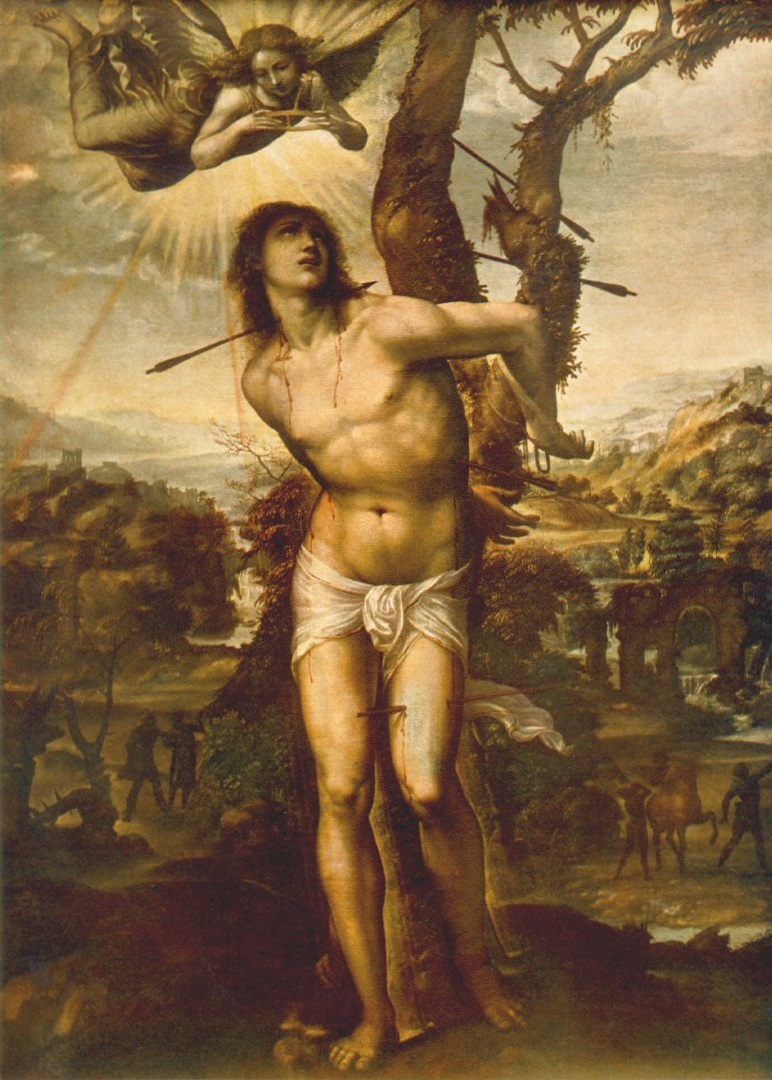
- Saint Sebastian
- Pronunciation: English: /sɪˈbæstʃən/ sib-AS-chən, UK also /sɪˈbæstiən/ sib-AST-ee-ən; German: [zeˈbasti̯a(ː)n] Romanian: [sebastiˈan] Spanish: [seβasˈtjan]
- Gender: Male

Origin
- Language: Greek
- Meaning: "from Sebastia", "Augustus"

Other names
- Related names: Sebastiaan, Sebastiano, Sébastien, Sebastião, Bastiaan, Bastian, Bastien, Bas, Augustus, Austin

Sebastian or Sebastiæn is both a given name and a surname.

== History ==
It comes from the Greek name Sebastianos (Σεβαστιανός) meaning "from Sebastia" (Σεβάστεια), which was the name of the city now known as Sivas, located in the central portion of what is now Turkey; in Western Europe the name comes through the Latinized intermediary Sebastianus. It was a name of ancient Greek origin, given to children not born free and found on the streets of Sebastia. The name of the city is derived from the Greek word σεβαστός (sebastos), "venerable", which comes from σέβας sebas, "awe, reverence, dread", in turn from the verb σέβομαι (sebomai), "feel awe, scruple, be ashamed". Sebastos was the Greek calque of the title Augustus, which was used for Roman emperors. Sebastian became a widely used name because it was the name of Saint Sebastian, a third-century Christian martyr.

== Variations ==
- French: Sébastien/Sebastien, Jean-Sébastien
- Georgian: Sevasti (სევასტი)
- German: Bastian is a short form of Sebastian
- Hungarian: Sebestyén
- Italian: Sebastiano
- Russian: Sevastyan (from which the surname Sevastyanov is derived)
- Spanish: Sebastián

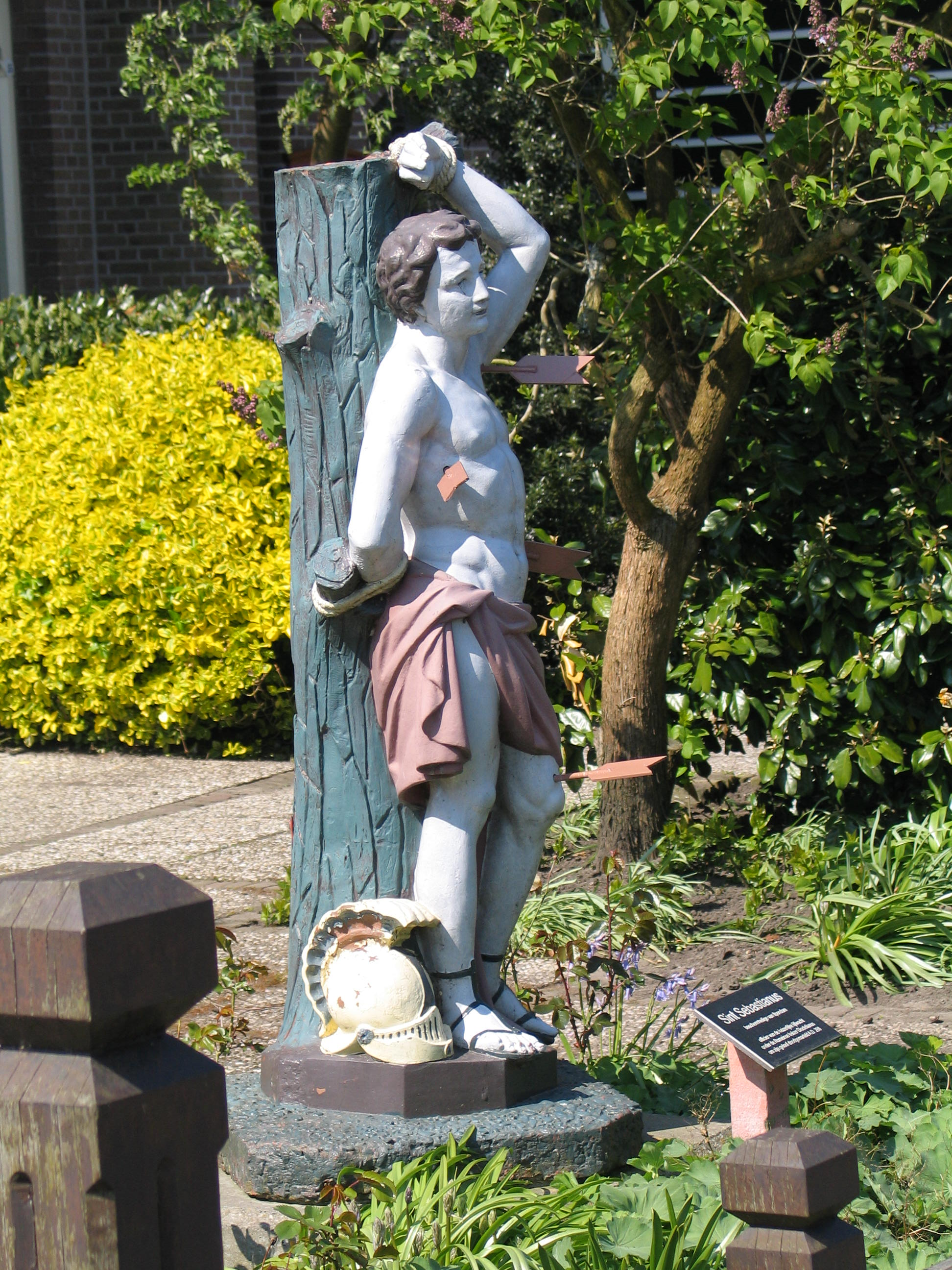
Saint Sebastian in Ilpendam, Netherlands

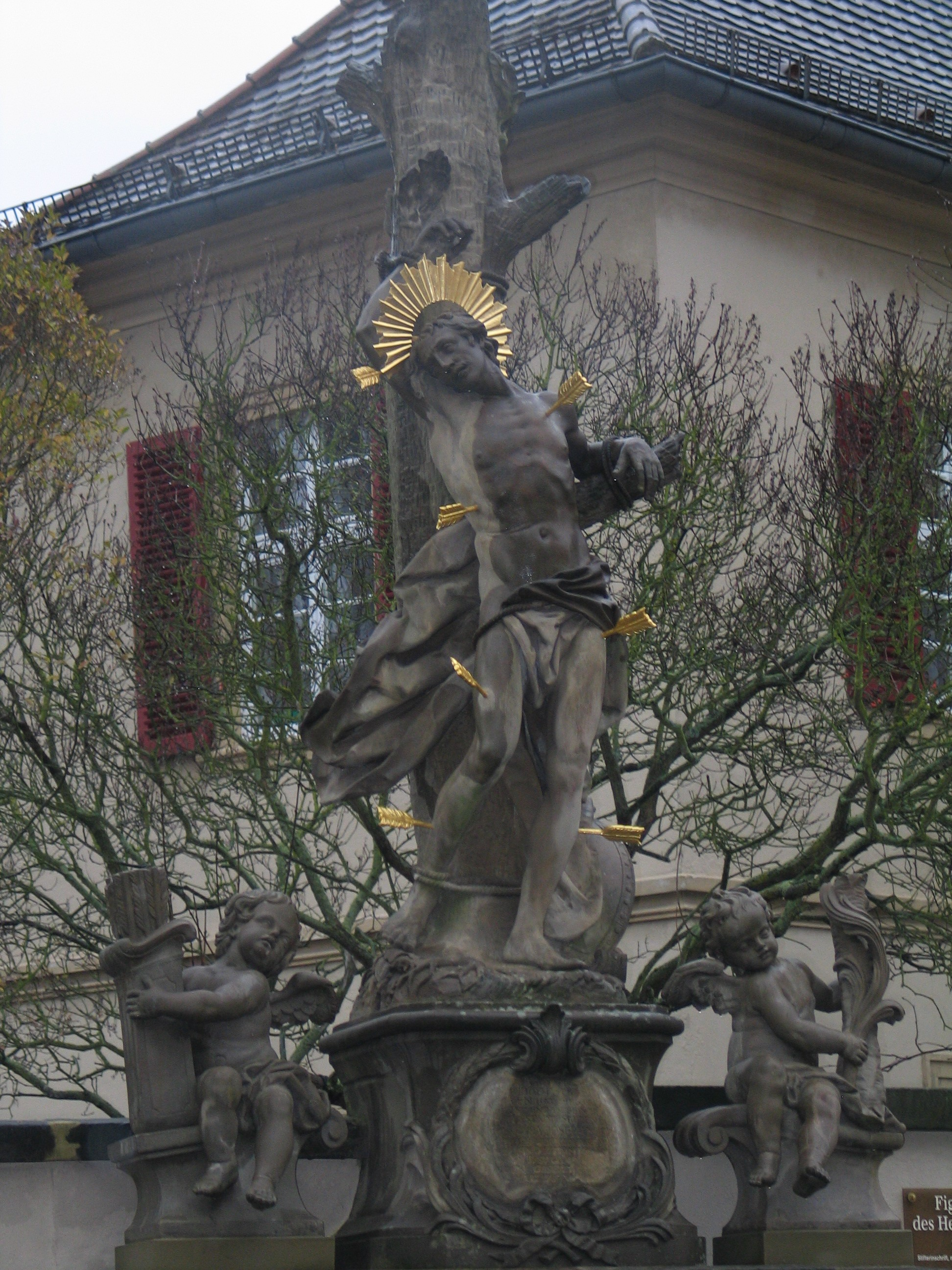
Saint Sebastian in Bamberg, Germany

== People ==
=== Given name ===
- Johann Sebastian Bach (1685), German composer and musician of the late Baroque period
- Sebastián Abreu (1976), Uruguayan soccer player
- Sebastian Aho (ice hockey, born 1996), Swedish ice hockey player
- Sebastian Aho, Finnish ice hockey player
- Sebastian Andersen (born 1988), Danish athlete
- Sebastian Anderson (born 2002), American athlete
- Sebastian Andersson (born 1991), Swedish athlete
- Sebastian James (singer) (born 1992), American musician, former percussionist for Nigel Dupree Band
- Sebastian Arcelus (born 1976), American actor
- Sebastian Bach (born 1968), Canadian heavy metal singer, former member of Skid Row
- Sebastian Baez (born 2000), Argentine tennis player
- Sebastian Barry (born 1955), Irish novelist, playwright and poet
- Sebastián Battaglia (born 1980), Argentine football manager and player
- Sebastián Beccacece (born 1980), Argentine football manager
- Sebastian Binder (1792–1845), Austrian opera singer
- Sebastian Bodu (born 1970), Romanian politician
- Sebastian Boenisch (born 1987), Polish footballer
- Sebastian Bonau (born 1989), German politician
- Sebastián Borensztein (born 1963), Argentine filmmaker
- Sebastian Borza (born 2005), Romanian professional footballer
- Sebastian Brant (1457/1458–1521), German humanist and satirist
- Sebastian Brendel (born 1988), German canoeist
- Sebastian Bucur (born 1996), Romanian professional footballer
- Seb Buddle, Hong Kong professional footballer
- Sebastian Buff (c.1829–1880), Swiss portrait painter
- Sebastian Cabot (explorer) (c. 1484–1557), Italian explorer
- Sebastian Cabot (actor) (1918–1977), British actor
- Sebastian Castellio (1515–1563), French preacher and theologian
- Sebastián Čederle (born 2000), Slovak ice hockey player
- Sebastián Cejas (born 1975), Argentine footballer
- Sebastian Chacon (born 1993), American actor
- Sebastian Chitoșcă (born 1992), Romanian professional footballer
- Sebastian Chmara (born 1971), Polish decathlete
- Sebastian Ciobanu (born 1985), Romanian super heavyweight kickboxer
- Sebastian Cluer (born 1979), Canadian film director, producer, developer and writer
- Sebastian Coe (born 1956), British politician and former track and field athlete
- Sebastian Colloredo (born 1987), Italian ski-jumper
- Sebastian Croft (born 2001), English actor
- Sebastian Currier (born 1959), American composer
- Seb Dance (born 1981), British politician
- Sebastian Davis (born 1980 or 1981), American YouTuber
- Sebastian Dehmer (born 1982), German triathlete
- Sebastian Deisler (born 1980), German professional footballer
- Sebastian Doggart, English-American filmmaker, writer, journalist, translator, and activist
- Sebastián Driussi (born 1996), Argentine professional footballer
- Sebastian Duterte (born 1987), Filipino politician
- Sebastian Edathy (born 1969), German politician
- Sebastián Eguren (born 1981), Uruguayan football manager and player
- Sebastian Erl, German Eurodance singer
- Sebastian ErraZuriz (born 1981), American designer, artist, entrepreneur and activist
- Sebastian Faulks (born 1953), British author
- Sebastian Fiedler (born 1973), German politician
- Sebastian "Forsen" Fors (born 1990), Swedish Twitch streamer
- Sebastián Francini (born 1989), Argentine actor
- Sebastian Fülle (born 1992), German basketball player
- Sebastian Fundora (born 1997), American professional boxer
- Sebastian Ghiță (born 1978), Romanian businessman and politician
- Sebastian Giovinco (born 1987), Italian footballer
- Sebastian Gutierrez (born 1974), Venezuelan film director and producer
- Sebastián Gutiérrez (footballer) (born 1997), Colombian footballer
- Sebastian Haffner (1907–1999), German journalist and historian
- Sebastian Hertner (1991–2025), German footballer
- Sebastian Horsley (1962–2010), English artist
- Sebastian Hüller (born 2000), German politician
- Sebastian Ingrosso (born 1983), Swedish D.J., member of Swedish House Mafia
- Sebastian Janikowski (born 1978), Polish-born American NFL football player
- Sebastian Joseph-Day (born 1995), American football player
- Sebastian Jung (born 1990), German professional footballer
- Sebastian Junger (born 1962), American journalist, author and filmmaker
- Sebastian Karlsson (singer) (born 1985), Swedish singer
- Sebastian Kehl (born 1980), German professional footballer
- Sebastian Killinger (born 1986), German politician
- Sebastián Kindelán y Oregón (1763–1836), Spanish colonel of the Spanish Army
- Sebastian Koch (born 1962), German actor
- Sebastian Koch (politician), German politician
- Sebastian Korda (born 2000), American tennis player
- Sebastian Kurz (born 1986), Austrian politician
- Sebastian Larsson (born 1985), Swedish professional footballer
- Sebastian Lletget (born 1992), American professional soccer player
- Sebastián Lerdo de Tejada (1823–1889), 27th president of Mexico from 1872 to 1876
- Sebastian Mailat (born 1997), Romanian professional footballer
- Sebastian Maniscalco (born 1973), American stand-up comedian
- Sebastian Marburger (born 1997), German para cross-country skier
- Sebastián Martínez (disambiguation), several people
- Sebastian Melmoth (1854–1900), Oscar Wilde's pseudonym during his exile in France
- Sebastian Mielitz (born 1989), German footballer
- Sebastián Montoya (born 2005), Colombian racing driver
- Sebastian Müller (politician) (born 1988), German politician
- Sebastian Newdigate (1500–1535), English Roman Catholic priest and martyr
- Sebastian Olderheim (born 2007), Norwegian footballer
- Sebastian Papaiani (1936–2016), Romanian actor
- Sebastian Pasquali (born 1999), Australian professional footballer
- Sebastián Piñera (1949–2024), Chilean politician and former president of Chile
- Sebastián Prieto (tennis) (born 1975), Argentinian tennis player
- Sebastian Prödl (born 1987), Austrian professional footballer
- Sebastian Roché (born 1964), French actor
- Sebastian Rode (born 1990), German professional footballer
- Sebastián Rozental (born 1976), Chilean professional soccer player
- Sebastian Rudy (born 1990), German professional footballer
- Sebastian Sauve (born 1987), American model
- Sebastian Schmitt (born 1996), German basketball player
- Sebastian Schmitt (politician) (born 1988), German politician
- Sebastián (sculptor) (Enrique Carbajal González; born 1947), Mexican monumental sculptor
- Sebastian Sebulonsen (born 2000), Norwegian footballer
- Sebastian Seeman (born 1966), Indian politician and filmmaker
- Sebastian Shaw (disambiguation), several people
- Sebastian Sponevik (born 2005), Norwegian artistic gymnast
- Sebastian Stan (born 1982), Romanian-American actor
- Sebastian Suciu (born 1986), Romanian politician
- Sebastian Świderski (born 1977), Polish volleyball player
- Sebastian Telfair (born 1985), American basketball player
- Sebastian Thiel (born 1990), Zambian film director, writer and producer
- Sebastian Thul (born 1980), German politician
- Sebastian Valdez (born 2002), American football player
- Sebastián Vázquez (basketball) (born 1985), Uruguayan basketball player
- Sebastian Vettel (born 1987), German Formula One driver
- Sebastian Walter (born 1990), German politician
- Sebastian Watermeier (born 1984), German politician
- Sebastian Wiese (born 1972), German freestyle swimmer
- Sebastian Wippel (born 1982), German politician
- Sebastian Yatra, Colombian singer, songwriter and actor
- Sebastián Zurita, Mexican actor

=== Surname ===
- Cuthbert Sebastian (1921–2017), British Governor-General of St. Kitts and Nevis from 1996 to 2013
- Dorothy Sebastian, American silent film actress
- Guy Sebastian, winner of the 2003 (first) series of Australian Idol
- Jam Sebastian (1986–2015), Filipino online personality
- Jaybee Sebastian (1980–2020), Filipino criminal
- Joan Sebastian (1951–2015), Mexican singer-songwriter, actor
- John Sebastian (born 1944), American songwriter, member of the Lovin' Spoonful
- John Sebastian (classical harmonica player) (1914–1980), American classical harmonica player and composer
- Kenny Sebastian (born 1990), Indian Stand-up comedian and actor
- Linus Sebastian (born 1986), Canadian YouTube personality, presenter, producer, and founder of Linus Media Group
- Madonna Sebastian, Indian actress and singer
- Miguel Ángel Sebastián Martínez (born 1950), Spanish-born Chadian Roman Catholic bishop
- Mihail Sebastian, Romanian writer
- Rita Sebastian (died 1996), Sri Lankan journalist
- Roberto Sebastian (1944–2012), Filipino government official and Secretary of Agriculture
- Robin Sebastian, British actor
- Tim Sebastian (born 1952), British journalist
- Tim Sebastian (footballer), German defender
- Virginia Sebastian, American clubwoman

== Fictional characters ==
- Sebastian (The Little Mermaid), a crab featured in The Little Mermaid (1989) and related works
- Sebastian Hastings in the 2006 film She's the Man
- Sebastian, the true name of the Narrator from the novel and film Fight Club
- Sebastian, Alexandra Cabot's cat in the Josie and the Pussycats comic book cartoon series
- Sebastian, freelance programmer and bachelor from the video game Stardew Valley
- Sebastian, Lili De Rochefort's butler in Tekken Tag Tournament 2 and Tekken 5: Dark Resurrection
- Sebastian, character in the 1990 animated series Midnight Patrol: Adventures in the Dream Zone
- Sebastian, in William Shakespeare's play The Tempest
- Sebastian Beach, the butler of Lord Emsworth and his family in the Blandings stories by P. G. Wodehouse
- Sebastian Becker, main character in a trilogy of books by Stephen Gallagher: The Kingdom of Bones (2007), The Bedlam Detective (2012) and The Authentic William James (2015)
- Bastian Balthazar Bux, lead in The Neverending Story series
- Sebastian Castellanos, main character in The Evil Within series
- Sebastian "Bash" de Poitiers, in the television series Reign
- Sebastian De Rosa, in the Alien vs. Predator
- Lord Sebastian Flyte, in Evelyn Waugh's novel Brideshead Revisited
- Sebastian Hawks from Mike Leigh's movie Naked (1993)
- Sebastian Kydd, Carrie's love interest in The Carrie Diaries
- Sebastian LaCroix, leader of the L.A Camarilla in the video game Vampire: The Masquerade – Bloodlines
- Sebastian "Bash" Lacroix, main character in the Canadian television show Anne with an E (2017–2019)
- Sebastian Matthew-Smith from the Disney+ mockumentary High School Musical: The Musical: The Series
- Sebastian Michaelis, the demonic butler from the manga and anime Kuroshitsuji
- Sebastian Milton, character and antagonist of the Walking Dead, who murdered the protagonist Rick Grimes
- Bass Monroe, nickname of Sebastian Monroe, the fictional President in Revolution
- Colonel Sebastian Moran, a Sherlock Holmes villain
- Hector Sebastian, fictional writer, narrator of later episodes of the Three Investigators
- J.F. Sebastian from Blade Runner (1982)
- Mr. Sebastian, codebreaker in the film Sebastian (1968)
- Serena Sebastian, English name of the anime character Sonoko Suzuki in the English adaptations of Detective Conan (Case Closed)
- Sebastian Shaw (character), supervillain from Marvel Comics
- Bastion (comics), real name Sebastion Gilberti, a villain from Marvel Comics
- Sebastian Smythe, recurring character in the 3rd and 4th season of Glee
- Sebas Tian, head butler in the anime and light novel Overlord
- Sebastian Vael, Prince of Starkhaven in Dragon Age II
- Sebastian Valmont, in the film Cruel Intentions (1999)
- Sebastian Verlac, in Cassandra Clare's The Mortal Instruments series novel City of Glass
- Sebastian Wilder, in the film La La Land (2016)
- a title character of Belle et Sébastien, a 1965 novel, and various film and television adaptations
- the title character of Sebastian Star Bear: First Mission, a 1991 Dutch animated film
- Sebastien Le Livre/Booker in The Old Guard (2020 film)
- Sebastian Sallow, in the game Hogwarts Legacy
- Sebastian “Bez” Willis, main character in the television show The Runarounds

== Mascots ==
- Sebastian the Ibis, the mascot of the University of Miami
