= Bastian =

Bastian is a German short form of Sebastian.

== Surname ==
Notable people with the surname include:

- Adolf Bastian (1826–1905), 19th-century anthropologist
- Ali Bastian (born 1982), English television actress
- Amy Bastian (born 1968), American neuroscientist
- Anura Bastian (1950–2014), Sri Lankan politician
- Bob Bastian (1938–2019), American farmer and politician
- Bruce Bastian (1948–2024), American computer programmer and businessman
- Charlie Bastian (1860–1932), American baseball player
- Donald N. Bastian, Canadian bishop
- Ed Bastian (born 1957), American business executive
- Frank O. Bastian, American medical doctor and neuropathologist
- Fritz Bastian (1898–1944), American tennis player
- Gert Bastian (1923–1992), German military officer and politician
- Gordon Bastian (1902–1987), British sailor
- Henry Charlton Bastian (1837–1915), English zoologist, physiologist and neurologist
- Hilda Bastian (fl. 1980s–1990s), Australian researcher
- Jolly Bastian, Indian stunt master
- Lan Bastian (born 1985), Indonesian footballer
- Mary Bastian (1948–1985), Tamil Human Rights activist
- Michael Bastian (born 1965), American fashion designer
- Nathan Bastian (born 1997), Canadian ice hockey player
- Nico Bastian (born 1990), German racing driver
- Noah Bastian (born 1979), American actor
- Peter Bastian (1943–2017), Danish musician
- Stan Bastian (born 1941), American educator and politician
- Stanley Bastian (born 1958), American judge
- Vino G. Bastian (born 1982), Indonesian actor
- Wally Bastiansz (died 1985), Sri Lankan musician
- Walter M. Bastian (1891–1975), American judge
- Warwick Bastian (1914–1979), Australian Anglican bishop

== Given name ==
Notable people with the given name include:

- Bastián Arce (born 1989), Chilean footballer
- Bastian Badu (born 2000), French footballer
- Bastian Baker (born 1991), Swiss singer and songwriter
- Bastian Buus (born 2003), Danish racing driver
- Bastian Clevé (born 1950), German filmmaker and producer
- Bastian Dankert (born 1980), German football referee
- Bastian Doreth (born 1989), German basketball player
- Bastian Ernst (born 1987), German politician
- Kai-Bastian Evers (born 1990), German footballer
- Bastian Hartmann (born 1984), German politician
- Bastian Heidenfelder (born 1986), German footballer
- Bastian Henning (born 1983), German footballer
- Bastian Hohmann (born 1990), German footballer
- Didrik Bastian Juell (born 1990), Norwegian freestyle skier
- Bastian Kaltenböck (born 1983), Austrian ski jumper
- Bastian Kersaudy (born 1994), French badminton player
- Bastian Knittel (born 1983), German tennis player
- Bastian Kolmsee (born 1981), German racing driver
- Bastian Kurz (born 1996), German footballer
- Bastian Müller (born 1991), German footballer
- Bastian Obermayer (born 1977), German investigative journalist
- Bastian Oczipka (born 1989), German footballer
- Julius Bastian Olsen (1875–1936), Norwegian politician
- Bastian Pagez (fl. 1566), servant of Mary, Queen of Scots
- Bastian Pastewka (born 1972), German comedian
- Bastian Pinske (born 1978), German footballer
- Bastian Reinhardt (born 1975), German footballer
- Lars Bastian Ridder Stabell (1798–1860), Norwegian politician
- Bastian Roscheck (born 1991), German handball player
- Bastián San Juan (born 1994), Chilean footballer
- Bastian Schulz (born 1985), German footballer
- Bastian Schweinsteiger (born 1984), German football player
- Bastian Seibt (born 1978), German rower
- Bastian Seidel (born 1975), Australian politician and medical doctor
- Bastian Semm (born 1979), German actor
- Bastian Sick (born 1965), German journalist and author
- Bastián Solano Molina (born 1999), Chilean footballer
- Bastian Steger (born 1981), German table tennis player
- Bastian Swillims (born 1982), German sprinter
- Bastian Trinker (born 1990), Austrian tennis player
- Bastian Trost (born 1974), German actor
- Bastian Vasquez (1990–2015), Norwegian terrorist
- Bastian Winkelhaus, German card game player
- Bastián Yañez (born 2001), Chilean footballer

== See also ==
- Bastian Balthazar Bux, fictional character from The Neverending Story
- Bas Bron, producer and musician using the moniker Bastian.
- Bastian, Virginia, a community in the U.S. state of Virginia
