= Bastien =

Bastien is a name of French origin. It is a variant of Sebastian. The name may refer to:

== Given name ==
- Bastien Augusto (born 1999), French runner
- Bastien Auzeil (born 1989), French decathlon athlete
- Bastien Bernard (born 1976), French football midfielder
- Bastien Bouillon, French actor
- Bastien Chesaux (born 1991), Swiss motorcycle racer
- Bastien Coriton (born 1981), French politician
- Bastien Damiens (1995–2015), French slalom canoeist
- Bastien Fuster (born 1992), French rugby union player
- Bastien Geiger (born 1985), Swiss football right back
- Bastien Héry (born 1992), French football midfielder
- Bastien Lecouffe-Deharme (born 1982), French visual artist and novelist
- Bastien Marchive (born 1990), French politician
- Bastien Midol (born 1990), French freestyle skier
- Bastien Pagez (16th century), French servant and musician at the court of Mary, Queen of Scots
- Bastien Salabanzi (born 1985), French skateboarder
- Bastien Tronchon (born 2002), French professional cyclist
- Bastien Vivès (born 1984), French comic book artist

== Surname ==
- Alfred Bastien (1873–1955), Belgian artist, academic and soldier
- Baz Bastien (1919–1983), Canadian ice hockey player and coach
- Benoît Bastien (born 1983), French football referee
- Cléophas Bastien (1892–1943), Canadian provincial politician
- Fanny Bastien (born 1961), French actress
- Frédéric Bastien, Canadian author, historian, and journalist
- Jean Bastien (1915–1969), French football midfielder
- Jean Bastien-Thiry (1927–1963), French engineer who tried to assassinate de Gaulle
- Jephté Bastien, Canadian film director
- Kely Bastien, Haitian politician, president of the Senate of Haiti
- Louis Bastien (cyclist) (1881–1963), French Olympic road racing bicyclist
- Louis Bastien (Esperantist) (1869–1961), French military officer and Esperantist
- Pat Bastien (born 1991), American football player or coach
- Pierre Bastien (born 1953), French musician, composer, and instrument builder
- Red Bastien (1931–2012), American professional wrestler
- Samuel Bastien (born 1996), Belgian football midfielder
- Steve Bastien (cricketer) (born 1963), English cricketer
- Steve Bastien (athlete) (born 1994), American decathlete

== Fictional characters ==
- a character in Bastien und Bastienne, a one-act comic opera with music by Mozart
