= Sevastyan =

Sevastyan (Russian: Севастьян) is a Russian masculine given name, a counterpart of Sebastian. As a monastic name, the Old Church Slavonic version Севастиан is used. Patronymic surnames derived from this name include Sevastyanov, Sevastyanenko. Notable people with the name include:

- Sevastyan Dmitriyev (fl. 1629–1676), Rissan icon painter
- Sevastyan Kruchyonykh (1909–1975), Soviet military pilot
- Sevastian of Karaganda (1884–1966), archimandrite of the Russian Orthodox Church
- Sevastian Pilipchuk (1914–1992), bishop of the Russian Orthodox Church, bishop of Kirovograd and Nikolaev
- Sevastyan Tanatar (1849–1917), Russian chemist

== See also ==
- Alexander Sevastian
