= Fulle =

Fulle is a surname. Notable people with the surname include:

- Adrian Fulle (born 1972), American writer, director, and producer
- Jenny Fulle, American visual effects producer
- Sebastian Fülle (born 1992), German basketball player
- Siegfried Fülle (born 1939), German gymnast

== See also ==
- Fuller (surname)
