= Sebastiano =

Sebastiano is both a masculine Italian given name and a surname. Notable people with the name include:

- Sebastiano Antonio Tanara (1650–1724), Italian cardinal
- Sebastiano Baggio (1913–1993), Italian clergyman
- Sebastiano Bianchi (16th century), Italian engraver
- Sebastiano Bombelli (1635–1724), Italian painter
- Sebastiano Brunetti (died 1649), Italian painter
- Sebastiano Carezo (fl. 1780), Spanish dancer (Sebastián Cerezo)
- Sebastiano Conca (c. 1680 – 1764), Italian painter
- Sebastiano Dolci (1699–1777), Croatian writer
- Sebastiano Esposito (born 2002), Italian footballer
- Sebastiano Filippi (c. 1536 – 1602), Italian late Renaissance-Mannerist painter
- Sebastiano Galeotti (1656–1746), Italian painter
- Sebastiano Ghezzi (1580–1645), Italian painter and architect
- Sebastiano Guala (17th century), Italian church architect
- Sebastiano Giuseppe Locati (1861–1939), Italian architect
- Sebastiano Martinelli (1848–1918), Cardinal of the Roman Catholic Church
- Sebastiano Mazzoni (c. 1611 – 1678), Italian painter
- Sebastiano Mocenigo (1662–1732), Doge of Venice
- Sebastiano Nela (born 1961), Italian ex-footballer
- Sebastiano Pinna (born 1971), Italian ex-footballer
- Sebastiano del Piombo (c. 1485 – 1547), Italian Renaissance-Mannerist painter
- Sebastiano Ricci (1659–1834), Italian painter
- Sebastiano Rossi (born 1964), Italian footballer
- Sebastiano Santi (1788–1866), Italian painter
- Sebastiano Serafini, Italian actor, model, and musician
- Sebastiano Serlio (c. 1475 – 1554), Italian Mannerist architect
- Sebastiano Siviglia (born 1973), Italian football defender
- Sebastiano Taricco (1645–1710), Italian painter
- Sebastiano Timpanaro (1923–2000), Italian classical philologist, essayist, and literary critic
- Sebastiano Venier (c. 1496 – 1578), Doge of Venice
- Sebastiano Visconti Prasca (1883–1961), Italian military officer
- Sebastiano Ximenes (16th century), Italian banker
- Sebastiano Ziani (12th century), Doge of Venice
- Richiardi Sebastiano (1834–1904), Italian anatomist and zoologist

== See also ==
- Fort Sebastiano, in Italy
- San Sebastiano (disambiguation)
