= Kallinger =

Kallinger is a surname. Notable people with the surname include:

- Christian Kallinger (born 1982), Austrian darts player
- Joseph Kallinger (1935–1996), American serial killer

== See also ==
- Killinger
