= Šebestěnice =

- Municipality
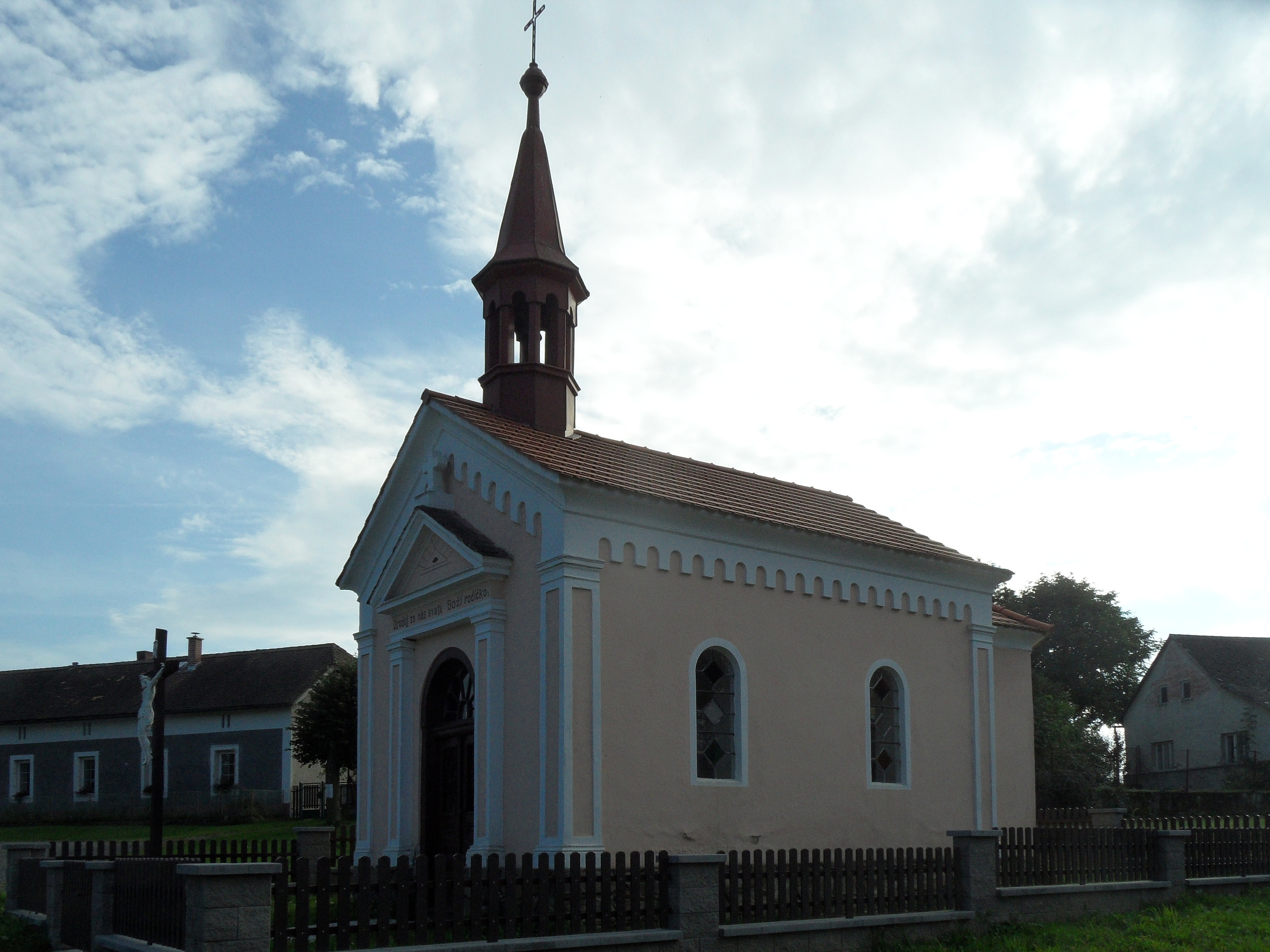
- Chapel of the Visitation of the Virgin Mary

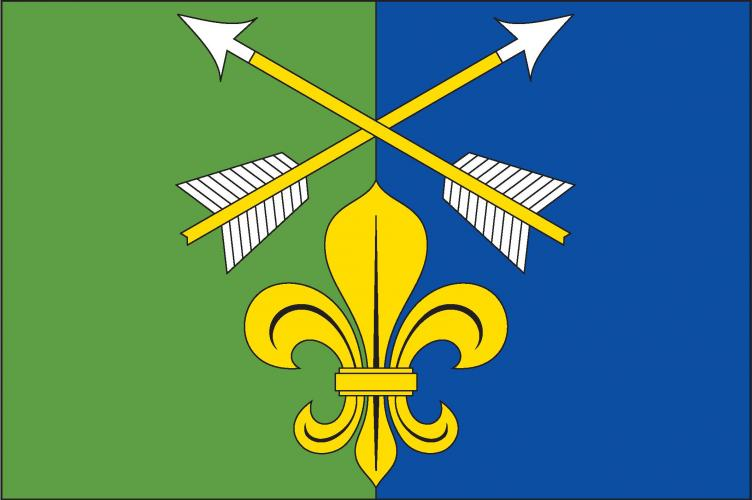
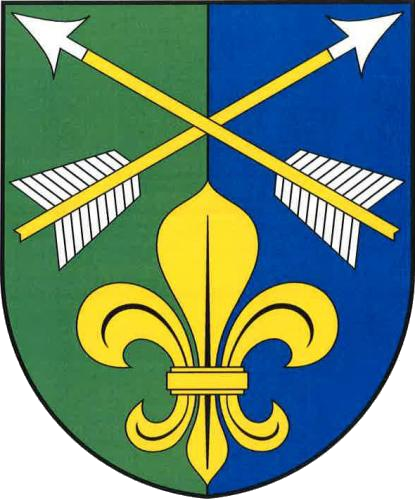
- Flag Coat of arms

- Location in the Czech Republic
- Coordinates: 49°49′46″N 15°21′55″E
- Country: Czech Republic
- Region: Central Bohemian
- District: Kutná Hora
- First mentioned: 1303

Area
  - Total: 3.29 km^{2} (1.27 sq mi)
- Elevation: 384 m (1,260 ft)

Population (2026-01-01)
  - Total: 84
  - Density: 26/km^{2} (66/sq mi)
- Time zone: UTC+1 (CET)
  - Summer (DST): UTC+2 (CEST)
- Postal code: 286 01
- Website: www.sebestenice.cz

Šebestěnice is a municipality and village in Kutná Hora District in the Central Bohemian Region of the Czech Republic. It has about 80 inhabitants.

== Etymology ==
The name is derived from the personal name Šebestián (a Czech variant of the name Sebastian), meaning "the village of Šebestián's people".

== Geography ==
Šebestěnice is located about 15 kilometres (9 mi) southeast of Kutná Hora and 65 km (40 mi) southeast of Prague. It lies in an agricultural landscape in the Upper Sázava Hills. The highest point is at 413 m (1,355 ft) above sea level. The stream Vranidolský potok flows through the southwestern part of the municipality. Its tributary, the stream Šebestěnický potok, flows through the village and supplies a system of two fishponds.

== History ==
The first written mention of Šebestěnice is from 1303. Until 1415, the village was owned by a local noble family that called themselves the Lords of Šebestěnice. The village then often changed hands. In the 17th century, Šebestěnice was acquired by the Trčka of Lípa family. The last noble owners of the estate were the Schwarzenberg family, who bought it in 1819.

== Demographics ==
Historical population

Year	Pop.	±%
1869	292	—
1880	279	−4.5%
1890	283	+1.4%
1900	261	−7.8%
1910	254	−2.7%

Year	Pop.	±%
1921	233	−8.3%
1930	210	−9.9%
1950	184	−12.4%
1961	178	−3.3%
1970	160	−10.1%

Year	Pop.	±%
1980	127	−20.6%
1991	121	−4.7%
2001	122	+0.8%
2011	89	−27.0%
2021	94	+5.6%

Source: Censuses

== Transport ==
There are no railways or major roads passing through the municipality.

== Sights ==
There are no protected cultural monuments in the municipality. The main landmark of Šebestěnice is the Chapel of the Visitation of the Virgin Mary.
