= Bas (name) =

Bas is both a given name and a surname. As a given name in Dutch it is short for Sebastiaan (Sebastian). It can also be short for the Arabic name Abbas, Basit and Bashir. Notable people with the name include:

== Given name ==
- Bas (born 1987), Sudanese-American rapper
- Bas Balkissoon (born c. 1952), politician in Toronto, Canada
- Bas van Bavel (born 1964), Dutch historian
- Bas of Bithynia, (c. 397–326 BC), first independent ruler of Bithynia
- Bas Bron, Dutch musical artist and producer of mostly electronic music
- Bas de Gaay Fortman (born 1937), Dutch politician and scholar
- Bas Giling (born 1982), Dutch professional road bicycle racer
- Bas Jan Ader (1942–1975), Dutch conceptual artist, performance artist, photographer and filmmaker
- Bas Leinders (born 1975), Belgian racing driver
- Bas Pease (1922–2004), British physicist
- Bas Roorda (born 1973), Dutch football (soccer) goalkeeper
- Bas Rutten (born 1965), Dutch mixed martial arts fighter and color commentator
- Bas Savage (born 1982), English professional footballer (soccer)
- Bas van de Goor (born 1971), Dutch volleyball player
- Bas van der Vlies (1942–2021), Dutch politician
- Bas van Fraassen (born 1941), Netherlands-born American philosopher
- Bas Oskam (born 1980), Dutch DJ
- Bas Takken (born 1999), Dutch Paralympic swimmer

== Surname ==
- Bärbel Bas (born 1968), German politician
- Bernardo Bas (1919–1991), de facto Federal Interventor of Córdoba, Argentina
- Cornelis Bas (1928–2013), Dutch mycologist
- Giulio Bas (1874–1929), Italian organist and composer
- Hernan Bas (born 1978), U.S. artist based in Florida
- Mery Bas (born 1968), Spanish singer
- Noël Bas (1877–1960), French gymnast
