= Wippel =

Wippel is a surname. Notable people with the surname include:

- John F. Wippel (1933–2023), American Catholic priest
- Sebastian Wippel (born 1982), German politician
