= Sebestyén =

Sebestyén (Hungarian pronunciation: [ˈʃɛbɛʃceːn]) is a Hungarian surname and given name, which is an equivalent of Sebastian. Notable people with the name include:

== Surname ==
- Balázs Sebestyén (born 1977), Hungarian television presenter
- Béla Sebestyén (1885–1959), Hungarian football player
- Györgyi Sebestyén (born 1974), Hungarian football player
- János Sebestyén (1931–2012), Hungarian musician
- Júlia Sebestyén (born 1981), Hungarian figure skater
- Kati Sebestyén, Hungarian violinist
- László Sebestyén (born 1956), Hungarian engineer
- Márta Sebestyén (born 1957), Hungarian musician
- Péter Sebestyén (born 1994), Hungarian motorcyclist
- Victor Sebestyen (born 1956), Hungarian historian
- Zoltán Sebescen (born 1975), German football player

== Given name ==
- Sebestyén of Esztergom (died 1007), Hungarian archbishop
- Sebestyén Ihrig-Farkas (born 1994), Hungarian football player
- Sebestyén Tinódi Lantos (1510–1556), Hungarian writer
