= Antal Zalai =

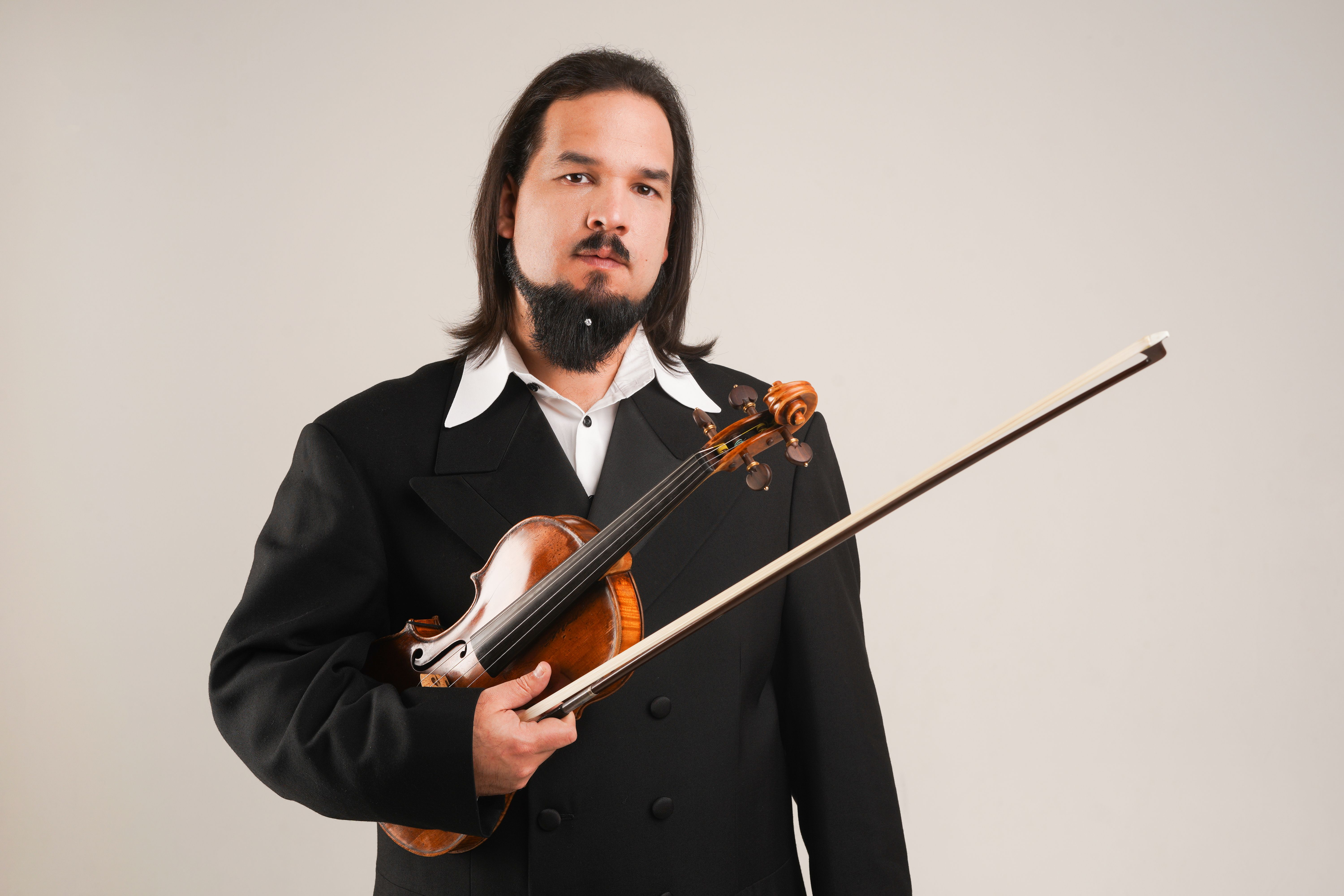
- Zalai in 2019
- Born: 31 January 1981 (age 44); Budapest, Hungary
- Occupation: Classical violinist
- Website: antalzalai.com

Antal Zalai (Hungarian: Zalai Antal; born Antal Szalai 31 January 1981) is a Hungarian concert violinist.

Zalai began his classical violin studies at the age of five. He graduated from the Royal Conservatory of Brussels in 2009 where he was a student of Kati Sebestyén. Prior to his studies in Brussels, his teachers were László Dénes, Péter Komlós and Jozef Kopelman in Budapest. In addition, Zalai has attended masterclasses with Isaac Stern, Pinchas Zukerman, Erick Friedman, Tibor Varga, Lewis Kaplan and György Pauk.

At age 15 he gained international recognition by performing the Bartók Violin Concerto No.1 at Yehudi Lord Menuhin's 80th anniversary tribute gala concert at the Grand Hall of the Franz Liszt Academy of Music in Budapest on 1 October 1996. In the development of his career, Zalai has enjoyed collaborations with eminent conductors such as Fabio Luisi, Paavo Järvi, Yoel Levi, Lawrence Foster, Gilbert Varga, Shlomo Mintz, Ludovic Morlot, Laurent Petitgirard, Enrique Bátiz Campbell, Yip Wing-sie, and Gábor Takács-Nagy.

In 2003, he was a soloist with the Naumburg Orchestral Concerts, in the Naumburg Bandshell, Central Park, in the summer series.

He made his UK debut in Liverpool in 2008 where he performed the Glazunov Violin Concerto with the Royal Liverpool Philharmonic and conductor Ludovic Morlot. He performed the same violin concerto at his Berlin debut in 2008, as soloist of the Deutsches Symphonie-Orchester Berlin in the Berliner Philharmonie.

In April 2010 Zalai made his Viennese debut in the Vienna Symphony's "Frühling in Wien 2010" gala concert conducted by Fabio Luisi in the Wiener Musikverein. He won the opportunity during an online competition on the internet platform Talenthouse.

As a recitalist, Zalai has performed in the Carnegie Hall Weill Recital Hall in New York City, the Kennedy Center Terrace Theater in Washington, D.C., the Grand Hall of the Moscow Conservatory, the Victoria Hall (Geneva), the Concert Hall of the Royal Conservatory of Brussels and the Chan Centre for the Performing Arts in Vancouver among others.

== Discography ==
- 1999 The Leo Weiner Album BMC CD 018
- 2001 Bach/Kreisler/Ysaÿe/Petrovics BMC CD 017
- 2003 Leopold Auer Hungaroton HCD32156
- 2010 George Enescu Violin Sonatas Nos. 1–3 Brilliant Classics 9165
- 2011 Béla Bartók Complete Works for Violin Vol.1 Brilliant Classics 9236
- 2012 Béla Bartók Complete Works for Violin Vol.2 Brilliant Classics 9270
- 2013 Béla Bartók Complete Works for Violin Vol.3 Brilliant Classics 9276
- 2017 Niccolò Paganini: 24 Caprices, Op.1. AZ1
- 2017 Virtuosity Vol.1. AZ2
- 2017 Virtuosity Vol.2. AZ3
- 2019 Virtuosity Vol.3. AZ4
