= Virtue Rewarded (disambiguation) =

Virtue Rewarded is a 1740 novel by Samuel Richardson.

Virtue Rewarded may also refer to:

- "Sebastian, or, Virtue Rewarded", an 1815 poem by Elizabeth Barrett Browning
- Irish Hospitality, or, Virtue Rewarded, a 1720 play by Charles Shadwell

== See also ==
- Vertue Rewarded
