= Sebastian =

Sebastian may refer to:

== People and fictional characters ==
- Sebastian (name), including a list of persons and fictional characters with the name
- Saint Sebastian, a Christian saint martyred in the 3rd century
- Sebastian of Portugal (1554–1578), the sixteenth king of Portugal and the Algarve
- Infante Sebastian of Portugal and Spain (1811–1875), Infante of Portugal (1811) and Infante of Spain (1824)
- Sebastián (sculptor) (born 1947), artist based in Mexico
- Sebastian (French musician), stage name of French musician, composer, producer, mixer, engineer, vocalist and DJ Sébastien Akchoté-Bozović (born 1981)
- Sebastian (singer), stage name of Danish musician Knud Torben Christensen (born 1949)
- Sebastian (rapper), stage name of American rapper Garland Mosley Jr., brother of Timbaland
- Sin With Sebastian (also known as Sebastian), German musician Sebastian Roth (born 1971)
- Mr. Sebastian, professional name of body pierce artist Alan Oversby (1933–1996)
- Sebastian Erl or Buddy, a German Eurodance singer
- Sebastian (Twelfth Night), one of the main characters from William Shakespeare's play Twelfth Night

== Arts and entertainment ==
=== Film and television ===
- Sebastian (1968 film), a British spy film
- Sebastiane, a 1976 British film in Latin about the saint
- Sebastian (1995 film), a Swedish drama film
- Sebastian (2017 film), a Canadian romantic drama
- Sebastian (2023 film), an American crime-horror film
- Sebastian (2024 film), a British-Finnish film

=== Literature ===
- Sebastian (Bishop novel), the first novel of the Landscapes of Ephemera duology written by Anne Bishop
- Sebastian (Durrell novel), the fourth volume in The Avignon Quintet series by Lawrence Durrell
- "Sebastian, or, Virtue Rewarded", the name of an unpublished poem written around 1815 by the 9-year-old Elizabeth Barrett, later famous as Elizabeth Barrett Browning

=== Music ===
- Sebastian (album), 2006 debut album by Swedish pop/rock singer Sebastian Karlsson
- "Sebastian" (song), 1973 song by Cockney Rebel, from The Human Menagerie album

== Places ==
=== Australia ===
- Sebastian, Victoria, a town

=== United States ===
- Sebastian, Florida, a city
- Sebastian, Ohio, an unincorporated community
- Sebastian, Texas, a census-designated place
- Sebastian County, Arkansas

== See also ==
- Saint-Sébastien (disambiguation)
- San Sebastian (disambiguation)
- Sebastianism, the belief that the sleeping king Sebastian of Portugal will return to save his people
- Sébastien
