= Sebastien (disambiguation) =

Sébastien or Sebastien is a French male given name, could also be Seb for short

It may also refer to:

- Sebastien (band), Czech power metal band
- Tropical Storm Sebastien, in the 1995 Atlantic hurricane season
