= Sebastiaan =

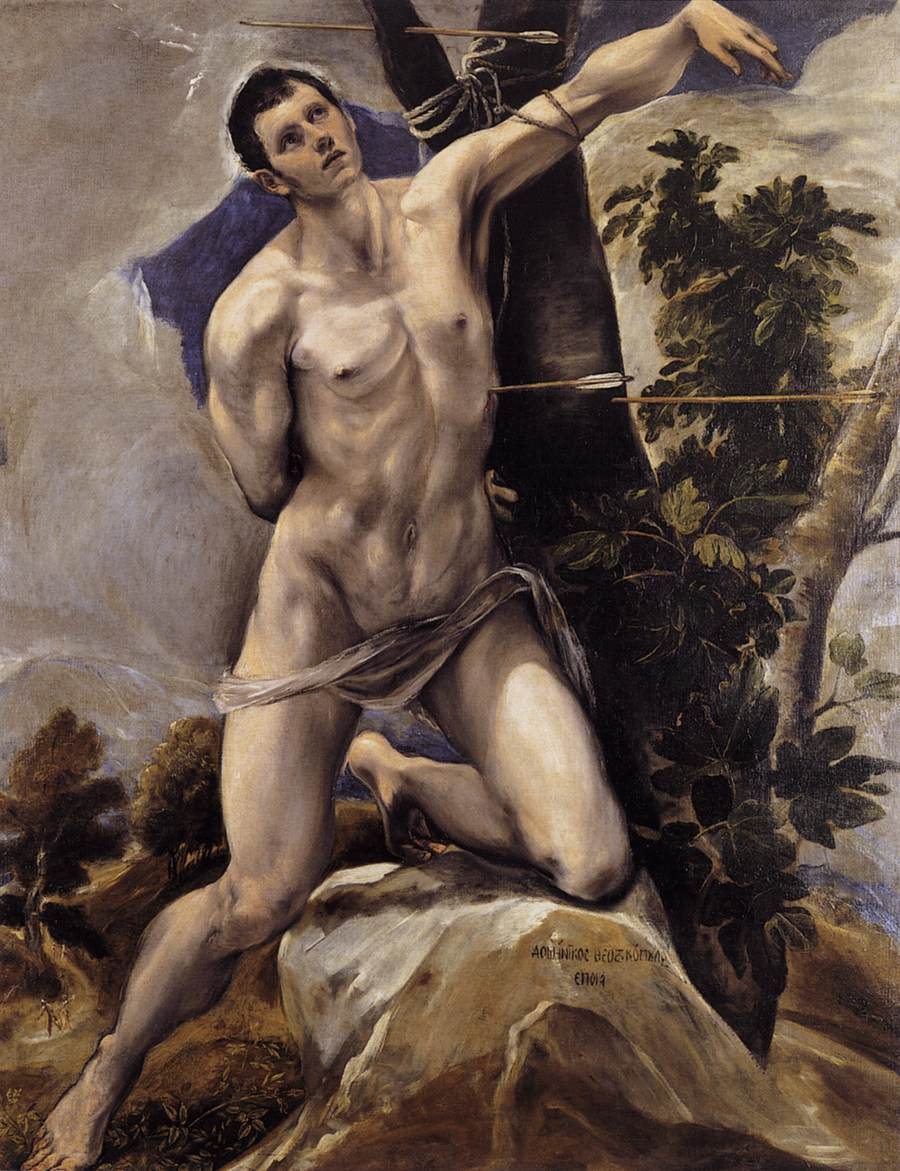
The Martyrdom of Saint Sebastian

Sebastiaan, in the past also Sebastiaen, is the Dutch form of the masculine given name Sebastian. People with the name include:

- Sebastiaen van Aken (1648–1722), Flemish historical painter
- Sebastiaan van Bemmelen (born 1989), Dutch volleyball player
- Sebastiaan Bleekemolen (born 1978), Dutch racing driver
- Sebastiaan Bökkerink (born 1994), Dutch footballer
- Sebastiaan Bornauw (born 1999), Belgian footballer
- Sebastiaan Bowier (born 1987), Dutch cyclist
- Sebastiaan Braat (born 1992), Dutch cricketer
- Sebastiaan Brebels (born 1995), Belgian footballer
- Sebastiaan Bremer (born 1970), Dutch painter and photographer
- Sebastiaan van den Brink (born 1982), Dutch footballer
- Sebastiaan De Wilde (born 1993), Belgian footballer
- Sebastiaan Gokke (born 1978), Dutch cricketer
- Sebastiaan van de Goor (born 1971), Dutch volleyball player
- Sebastiaan Haring (born 1968), Dutch philosopher, writer, and television presenter
- Sebastiaan van Houten (born 1975), American fangsmith and vampire book author
- Sebastiaen Jansen Krol (1595–1674), Dutch Director of New Netherland from 1632 to 1633
- Sebastiaan Nooij (born 1987), Dutch baseball player
- Sebastiaan Rutten (born 1965), Dutch martial artist
- Sebastiaan Steur (born 1984), Dutch footballer
- Sebastiaan Tromp (1889–1975), Dutch Jesuit priest, theologian, and Latinist
- Sebastiaan Verschuren (born 1988), Dutch freestyle swimmer
- Sebastiaen Vrancx (1573–1647), Flemish painter and draughtsman
- Sebastiaan Weenink (born 1986), Dutch squash player
- Sebastiaan Sijp (born 1988)

== See also ==
- Bastiaan
