= Bastien Lecouffe-Deharme =

French painter

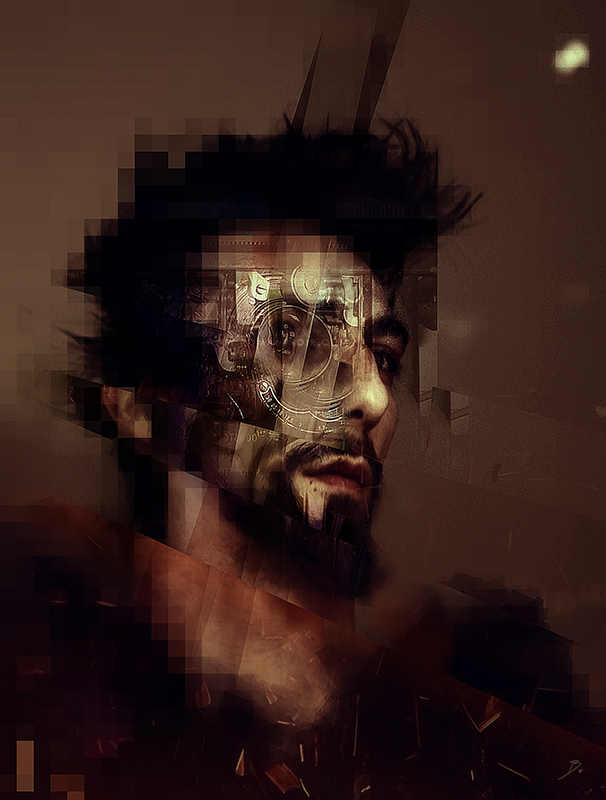
- Bastien Lecouffe Deharme, self-portrait (2013)
- Born: 10 January 1982 (age 44); Vannes, France
- Occupations: Illustrator, visual artist, photographer, writer
- Writing career
- Pen name: B.
- Genres: Science fiction Retrofuturism; Cyberpunk; Dark fantasy
- Website: www.roman-noir.com

Bastien Lecouffe Deharme (pseudonym: B.) is a French visual artist, illustrator, digital painter and novelist, whose work is mainly in the science-fiction, cyberpunk and dark fantasy genres. He currently lives in Portsmouth, Ohio, US.

== Biography ==
Bastien Lecouffe Deharme was born in Vannes in 1982.

In the early 1980s, his family moved from Paris to Auray in Brittany, where he would spend his childhood and teenage years. In 2000, B. passed a baccalauréat in literature and art, and joined the Université de Haute Bretagne in Rennes (Brittany), where he studied art. In 2006, he passed his Master of Fine Arts with honors; It is also around that time that he began to work as an illustrator, mainly creating book covers.

In 2007 he moved to Paris, where he worked as the artistic director for the art gallery Le Cabinet des Curieux. There he organized the shows Eros and Thanatos, Venus Robotica and Phantasms, as a trilogy. He also worked on "Chroniques des Ombres" (Shadows Chronicles), an online animated graphic novel written by Pierre Bordage, as an artistic director and Lead Artist.

Currently living in the United States, he continues working as a freelance artist. He creates book covers for author such as Philip K. Dick, Clive Barker, Chuck Palahniuk, H.P. Lovecraft, Frank Herbert and many more. He has worked for French publishers such as Gallimard (Folio-SF), Pocket, Fleuve Noir and Mnemos among others.

In April 2011, Bastien Lecouffe Deharme wrote and illustrated his first graphic-novel, Memories of Retrocity published by "Editions du Riez". The novel also features some texts written by Alain Damasio and Gilles Osvald, and digital paintings created by Johann Bodin and Anders Lazaret. Memories of Retrocity is acclaimed by the French critiques and is nominated for notorious awards, such as "Le Grand Prix de l’Imaginaire".

Today Bastien Lecouffe Deharme works with international clients (Tor Books, Random House, HarperCollins, Applibot, ...). His work is represented by the agency Shannon Associates (NYC).

== Cover art ==
- « Hellraiser » (The Hellbound Heart) by Clive Barker, published by Gallimard
- « Le Dernier des Maitres » (The last of the Masters) by Philip K. Dick, published by Gallimard
- « Velum » by Hal Duncan, published by Gallimard
- « Encre » by Hal Duncan, published by Gallimard
- « Arlis des Forains » by Mélanie Fazi, published by Gallimard
- « Serpentine » by Mélanie Fazi, published by Gallimard
- « Ordre Noir » by Johan Heliot, published by Fleuve Noir
- « La nuit de prédateur » by Robin Hobb, published by Pocket
- « Le preneur d'âmes » by Frank Herbert, soon to be published by Pocket
- « Le journal d'un ange » by Pierre Corbucci, published by Gallimard
- « Peste » de Chuck Palahniuk, published by Gallimard
- « La Vitesse de l'obscurité » by Elizabeth Moon, published by Gallimard
- « La Loi du désert » by Franck Ferric, published by the Editions du Riez
- « Moi et ce diable de Blues » by Ludovic Lavaissière & Richard Tabbi, published by the Editions du Riez
- « HPL 2007 », collection of short stories about H.P.Lovecraft; published by Malpertuis
- « Fight Club» by Chuck Palahniuk, published by Folio SF

== Memories of Retrocity : William Drum's Diary ==
B.'s first graphic novel, Memories of Retrocity : Le Journal de William Drum, was released in April 2011, edited by les Editions du Riez. This 120-page book comes in the form of the diary of William Drum, a former Chicago policeman who has been exiled in a strange metropolis named Retrocity. That city has not appeared on any map since it was infected by the "Retro-processus Virus", in the fifties, leading the authorities to quarantine it. William Drum will attempt to unveil the Retro-processus's secret and to survive his stay in this bio-mechanical, morbid city. B. illustrated and wrote the text himself.

On the eve of the winter of 2004, William Drum, former inspector in Chicago's police is exiled by his superiors into Retrocity.
A secluded, fallen City, that was hidden from everyone's sight over half a century ago
With the typewriter he found in his apartment as his only companion, William begins writing his diary, and plunges into the City.
A timeless City, whose citizens have long since deserted.
A sick City, plagued by a strange virus.
A City where mechanical parts replace human organs.
A City from which there is no coming back.

— B., (Back cover's text translation.) "Original text in French here"

The book features some texts by Gilles Osvald, and its "afterword, as a final burst [which] provides an insight into Retrocity's future", was written by Alain Damasio. The book is also accompanied by a CD containing an original soundtrack of twenty tunes that create an Industrial Music atmosphere reminiscent of the film Blade Runner and was composed by the musicians Don Quishoote, Neptunian8 and Subskan (from Ambivalence Recordz). Some pieces contain readings by Jean-Paul Dermont.

Overall, the book received excellent critiques. An English translation of the book is being written, as well as a sequel.

== Artbooks ==
- BL8D, 2023, 432 p., Caurette Editions (ISBN 978-2-38289-047-9). First artbook by Bastien Lecouffe Deharme.
- SOTA: State of the Art, a Digital Art Anthology, 2023, 220 p., Caurette Editions (ISBN 978-2382890059). Collective artbook with Marc Brunnet, Ryan Church, Jonny Duddle, Nathan Fowkes, Goro Fujita, Simon Goinard, Raphaël Lacoste, Nikolai Lockertsen, Ian Mcque, Jean-Baptiste Monge, and Marc Simonetti.
