= Killinger =

Killinger is a surname. Notable people with the surname include:

- Dana W. Killinger (1936–2001) American lawyer and pharmacist who served a one year term in the Kansas State Senate
- Frans Killinger (1875–1936), Hungarian-born military officer and Suriname police officer who committed the first coup d'etat in Suriname.
- Glenn Killinger (1898–1988), American football, basketball, and baseball player, coach, and college athletics administrator
- John Weinland Killinger (1824–1896), American politician
- Kerry Killinger (born 1949), American businessman
- Manfred Freiherr von Killinger (1886–1944), German naval officer, Freikorps leader, military writer and Nazi politician
- Sebastian Killinger (born 1986), German politician
