= Bastiaan =

Bastiaan is a Dutch masculine given name, short for Sebastiaan (Sebastian). People with this name include:

- Bastiaan Johan Christiaan Ader (1942–1975), Dutch conceptual and performance artist
- Bastiaan Belder (born 1946), Dutch politician
- Bastiaan Jan van Bochove (born 1950), Dutch politician
- Bastiaan Cornelis van Fraassen (born 1941), Dutch-born American philosopher
- Bastiaan de Gaay Fortman (born 1937), Dutch politician and scholar
- Bastiaan Geleijnse (born 1967), Dutch cartoonist and comics artist
- Bastiaan Giling (born 1982), Dutch road cyclist
- Bastiaan Govertsz van der Leeuw (1624–1680), Dutch landscape painter
- Bastiaan Johan Heijne (born 1960), Dutch writer and translator
- Bastiaan Lijesen (born 1990), Dutch swimmer
- Bastiaan Maliepaard (born 1938), Dutch cyclist
- Bastiaan Jacob Dirk Meeuse (1916–1999), Dutch-American botanist and naturalist
- Bastiaan Ort (1854–1927), Dutch lawyer, judge and Minister of Justice from 1913 to 1918
- Bastiaan Jacob Paauwe (1911–1989), Dutch footballer
- Bastiaan Ragas (born 1971), Dutch singer and actor
- Bastiaan Tamminga (born 1981), Dutch swimmer
- Bastiaan Johannis van der Vlies (1942–2021), Dutch politician
- Bastiaan van 't Wout (born 1979), Dutch politician
- Bastiaan Zuiderent (born 1977), Dutch cricketer

== See also ==
- Ross Bastiaan (born 1951), Australian military historian and dentist
