= Sebastião (given name) =

Spanish name

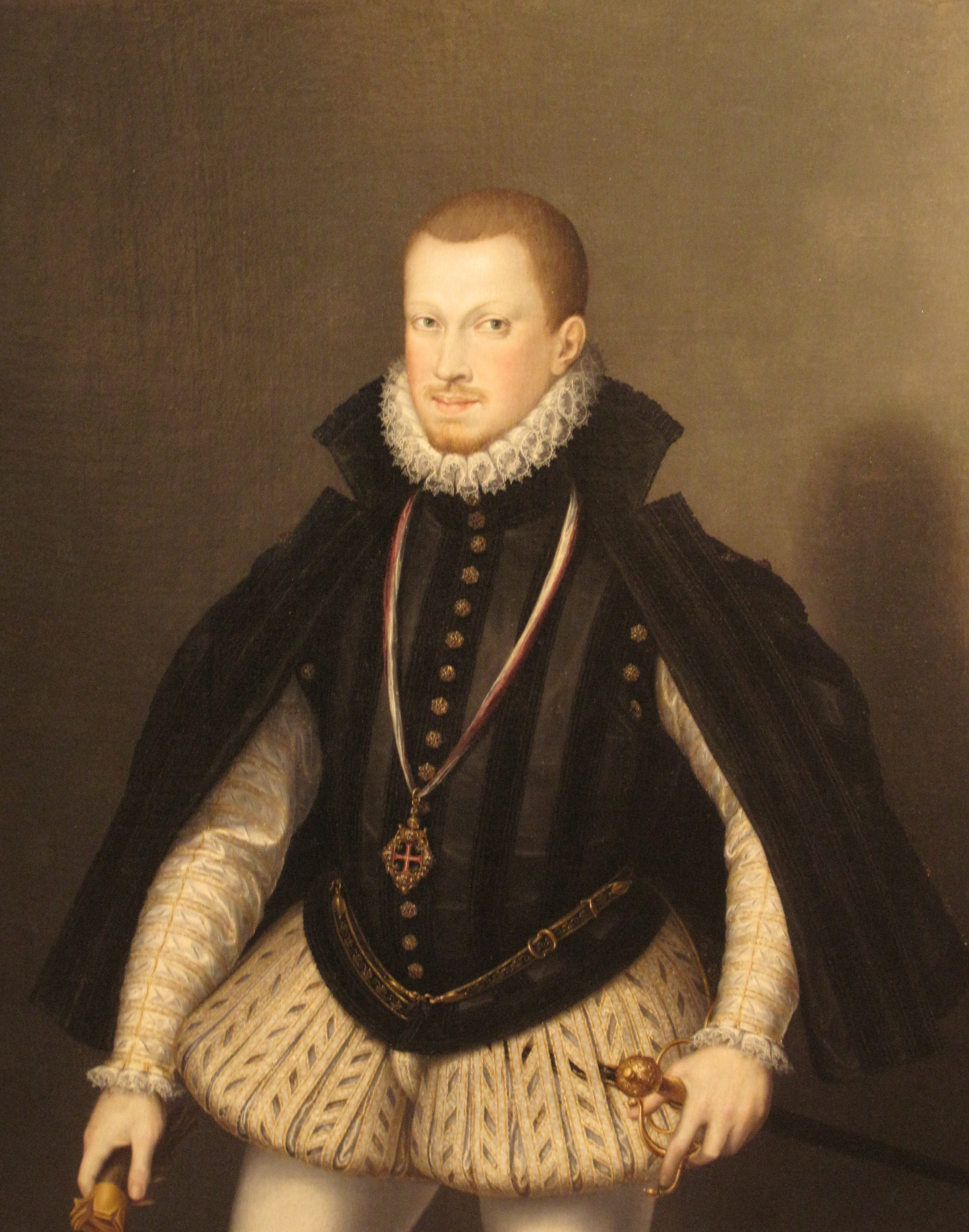
Sebastião I, also known as Sebastian of Portugal, Portuguese king

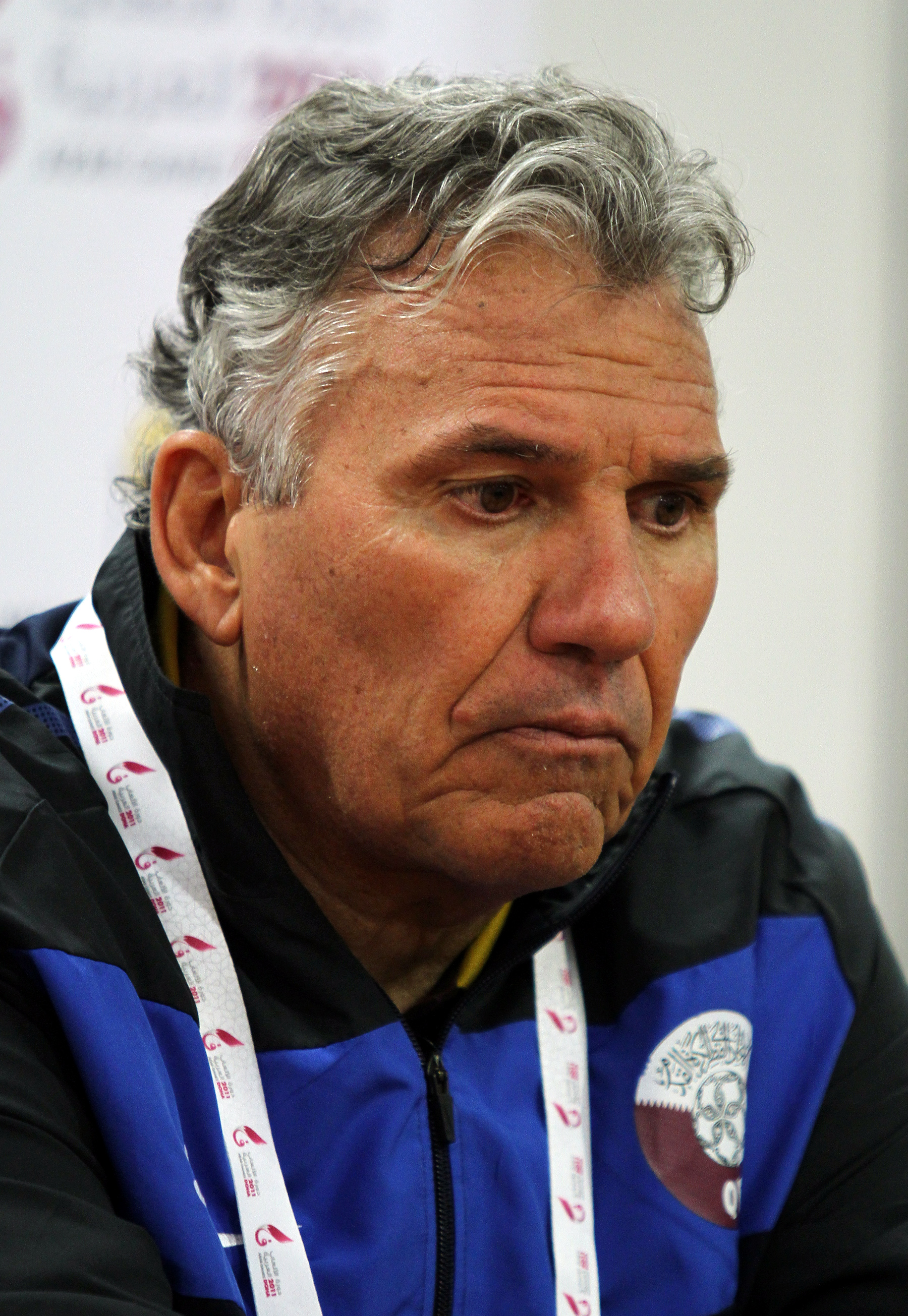
Sebastião Lazaroni, Brazilian football manager

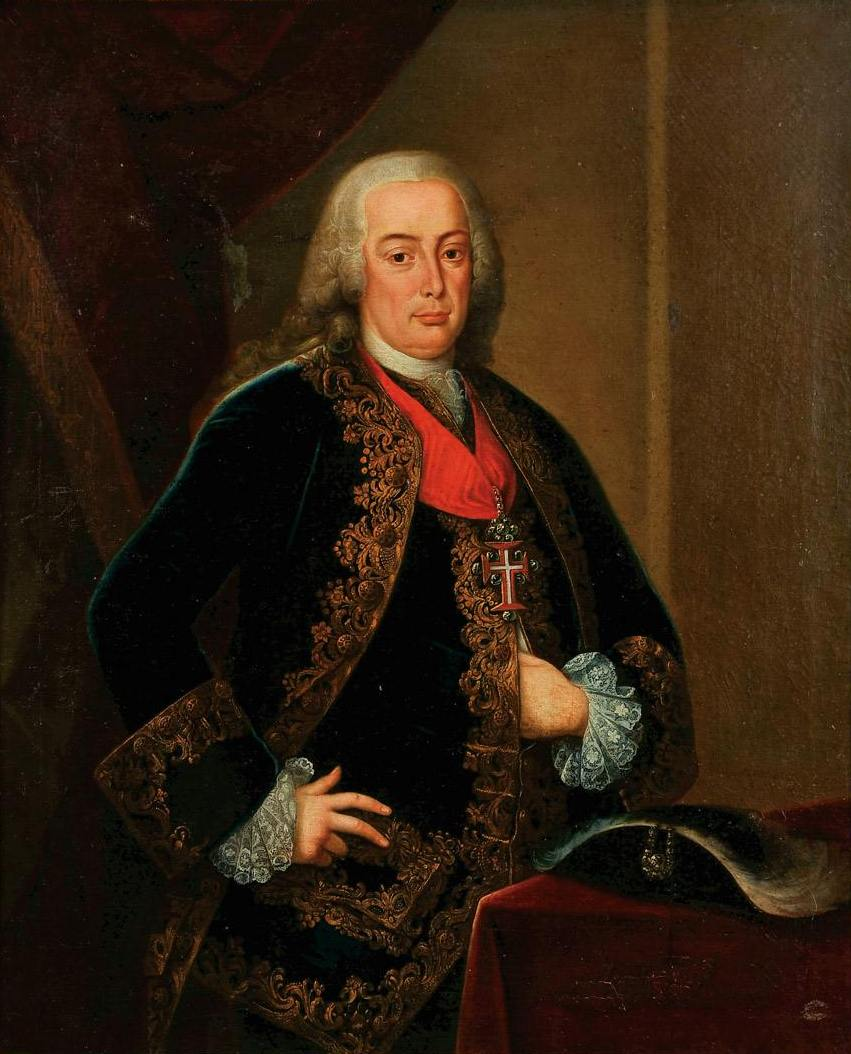
Sebastião José de Carvalho e Melo, 1st Marquis of Pombal, Portuguese statesman

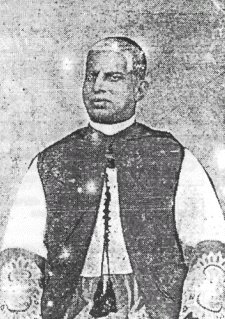
Sebastião Rodolfo Dalgado, Indo-Portuguese priest

Sebastião is a Portuguese male given name, descending from the Latin Sebastianus and equivalent to the English name Sebastian.

== Notable people ==
Notable people with this name include:

=== Art ===
- Sebastião Alba, Portuguese poet
- Sebastião Salgado, Brazilian photographer and photojournalist
- Sebastião Tapajós, Brazilian guitarist

=== Politics ===
- Sebastião Custódio de Sousa Teles, Portuguese politician
- Sebastião Fernandes da Costa, Portuguese lawyer and politician
- Sebastião I, also known as Sebastian of Portugal, Portuguese king
- Sebastião José de Carvalho e Melo, 1st Marquis of Pombal, Portuguese statesman

=== Religion ===
- Sebastião Barradas, Portuguese preacher
- Sebastião da Silveira Cintra, Brazilian cardinal
- Sebastião Rodolfo Dalgado, Indo-Portuguese priest
- Sebastião Soares de Resende, Portuguese Catholic bishop

=== Sport ===
==== Football ====
- Sebastião Gilberto, Angolan footballer
- Sebastião Lazaroni, Brazilian football manager
- Sebastião Loureiro da Silva, Portuguese footballer
- Sebastião Matateu, Portuguese footballer
- Sebastião Mendes, Brazilian footballer
- Sebastião Miranda da Silva Filho, Brazilian footballer
- Sebastião Nogueira, Portuguese footballer
- Sebastião Pereira do Nascimento, Brazilian footballer

==== Other ====
- Sebastião Amorim Gimenez, Brazilian basketball player
- Sebastião Herédia, Portuguese fencer
- Sebastião Wolf, Brazilian sport shooter

=== Other ===
- Sebastião Rodrigues Soromenho, Portuguese explorer
