= Alain Geiger =

Swiss footballer and manager (born 1960)

Personal information
- Date of birth: 5 November 1960 (age 66)
- Place of birth: Sion, Switzerland
- Height: 1.80 m (5 ft 11 in)
- Position: Defender

Senior career*
Years	Team	Apps	(Gls)
1977–1981	FC Sion	88	(7)
1981–1986	Servette	139	(18)
1986–1988	Neuchâtel Xamax	63	(8)
1988–1990	Saint-Étienne	70	(2)
1990–1995	FC Sion	173	(4)
1995–1997	Grasshoppers	33	(1)
Total		566	(40)

International career
1980–1996	Switzerland	112	(5)

Managerial career
- 1997–1998: Grasshoppers U21
- 1998–2002: Neuchâtel Xamax
- 2002–2003: FC Aarau
- 2003–2004: Grasshoppers
- 2005: Neuchâtel Xamax
- 2005–2006: FC Aarau
- 2006: Lausanne Sports
- 2006–2007: Olympique Safi
- 2009: Neuchâtel Xamax
- 2010: JS Kabylie
- 2011: Al-Masry
- 2011–2012: ES Sétif
- 2012: Ettifaq
- 2013: MC Alger
- 2015: MO Béjaïa
- 2015–2016: ES Sétif
- 2018–2023: Servette
- * Club domestic league appearances and goals

Alain Geiger (born 5 November 1960) is a Swiss football manager and a former player. He most recently managed Servette FC, leading them to a Champions League qualifying spot and a second-place finish in the championship.

He played mainly as a centre-back despite being only 1.80 m in a career that lasted 20 years, and made 112 appearances at the international level, being Switzerland national team's fifth most capped player. His son, Bastien, is also a professional footballer.

== Playing career ==
=== Club ===
Geiger started playing professionally in 1977 with FC Sion. He played just two matches in his first season but by 1978, he was a first-team regular in the side that went on to win the Swiss Cup in 1980.

In 1981, he signed for Servette, who were one of Switzerland's most successful teams at the time, and became an invaluable player for both club and country. He helped the club win the 1984 Swiss Cup, defeating Lausanne Sports 1–0 after extra time in the final, and the league title in 1985. An aspiring Neuchâtel Xamax side acquired his services in 1986, and he helped it win the national championship during the only two seasons he played for them, 1986–87 and 1987–88.

A move to Ligue 1 was on the cards next for Geiger, as he signed for Saint-Étienne during the Summer of 1988. He was a big hit and a first-team regular at Stade Geoffroy-Guichard, but opted for a return to Switzerland and Sion, in 1990. During his second spell, he saw the form of his life as he became captain for both club and the country. He lifted the league trophy for the fourth time in his career as Sion were crowned champions in 1991–92.

In 1995, Geiger signed for Grasshoppers, where he finishing his career after a further two seasons, having played 496 Swiss first division matches, with 38 goals.

=== International ===
Geiger made his international debut in Switzerland's 2–1 defeat to England at Wembley Stadium, on 19 November 1980, and went on to be capped 112 times and score five goals, between 1980 and 1996.

His last match was also against England, in a 1–1 draw at Euro 1996, on 8 June. He captained his country at both this competition and the 1994 FIFA World Cup in the United States, usually being accompanied at centre-back by Dominique Herr.

== Coaching career ==
Geiger's first managerial role was spent with the reserves of Grasshopper, in 1997. He did so well there that he was given the reigns at another old side, Neuchâtel Xamax, in July 1998. At Xamax, he helped develop the talents of Timothée Atouba, Papa Bouba Diop and Henri Camara, and helped the club avoid relegation from the league in his last two seasons.

Geiger quit the club in July 2002 to take over at FC Aarau, but the club were relegated into the Swiss Challenge League at the end of 2002–03 and he was given the sack. In December 2003, he was surprisingly named the manager of Grasshopper, but the team fared poorly under him and he was once again fired.

Subsequently, Geiger had short spells managing Neuchâtel Xamax, FC Aarau and Lausanne Sports before being given the job at Botola side Olympique Safi in 2006. He saved the club from relegation from Botola during the 2006–07 season, but resigned at the end of the campaign.

In June 2009, he was replaced by Pierre-André Schürmann as head coach of Neuchâtel Xamax.

In January 2010, he was appointed as manager of Algerian club JS Kabylie. On 14 December 2010, Geiger resigned from his position. During his time with the club, his most notable achievement was leading the team to the semi-finals of the 2010 CAF Champions League where they lost to eventual champions TP Mazembe.

On 23 September 2011, Geiger was appointed as manager of ES Sétif. In his first season with the club, he led the team to the league-cup double, winning the 2011–12 Algerian Ligue Professionnelle 1 and the 2011–12 Algerian Cup.

On 6 June 2012, Geiger became manager of Saudi club Ettifaq FC, signing a two-year contract with the club.

On 30 May 2013, Geiger reached an agreement with MC Alger to take over as new coach, succeeding Djamel Menad.

Taking over Geneva's Servette FC in 2018, the team wins the Swiss Challenge League at the end of his first season, getting promoted to the Super League. After this. He would go on to lead Servette up the league table and he would go on to get Servette FC 2nd in the table and a champions league qualifier spot during his last game as manager for the club. Alain left stealing the hearts of all members of the Section Grenat and left as one of the most notable managers in recent Servette history.

== Honours ==
=== Player ===
Sion

- Nationalliga A: 1991–92
- Swiss Cup: 1979–80, 1990–91, 1994–95

Servette

- Nationalliga A: 1984–85
- Swiss Cup: 1983–84

Neuchâtel Xamax

- Nationalliga A: 1986–87, 1987–88
- Swiss Super Cup: 1987

=== Manager ===
Grasshoppers

- Swiss Cup: runner-up 2003–04

ES Sétif

- Algerian Cup: 2011–12
- Algerian Ligue Professionnelle 1: 2011–12

Servette

- Swiss Challenge League: 2018–19
- UEFA Champions League Qualifier 2022-23

== See also ==
- List of men's footballers with 100 or more international caps
