= Sebastiano Pinna =

Italian footballer

Personal information
- Date of birth: 9 April 1971 (age 55)
- Place of birth: Cagliari, Italy
- Height: 1.76 m (5 ft 9 in)
- Position: Midfielder

Senior career*
Years	Team	Apps	(Gls)
1992–1992	Atletico Sirio		
1992–1994	Piobbico		
1994–1998	Tempio		
1998–2000	Torres		
2000–2005	Cagliari		
2005–2011	Torres		

Managerial career
- 2017–2018: Castiadas
- * Club domestic league appearances and goals

Sebastiano Pinna (born 9 April 1971) is a retired Italian football midfielder.
