= Jenny Fulle =

American visual effects supervisor

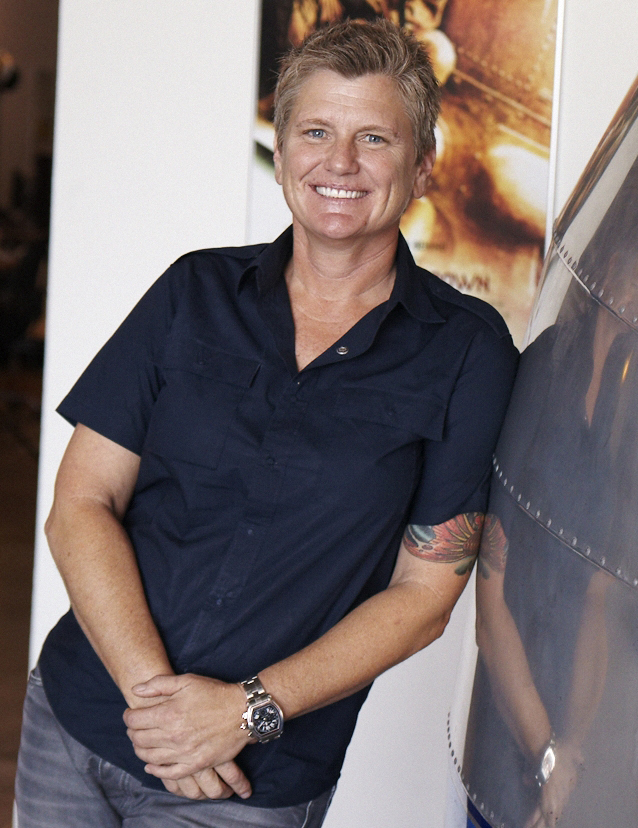
- Jenny Fulle ca. 2012
- Born: 1962 or 1963 (age 63–64); San Francisco, California
- Occupation: Visual effects producer
- Known for: Title IX Little League gender exclusion challenge

Jenny Fulle (born in San Francisco, California) is an American visual effects producer working in Hollywood. At the age of eleven, she gained prominence as the first girl admitted to play Little League baseball in the United States.

== Little League ==
=== Initial attempts ===
In 1972, aged nine, Jenny Fulle attempted to sign up for Mill Valley Little League in Marin County, California, but was denied on the basis of her gender. In February 1973, now aged 10, Fulle was again denied her application to join the Mill Valley Little League. She called the American League President, Pete Wolffe, who confirmed the rejection of her request. Fulle also contacted "a lot of ladies" involved with Little League for assistance, but continued to be barred by male officials.

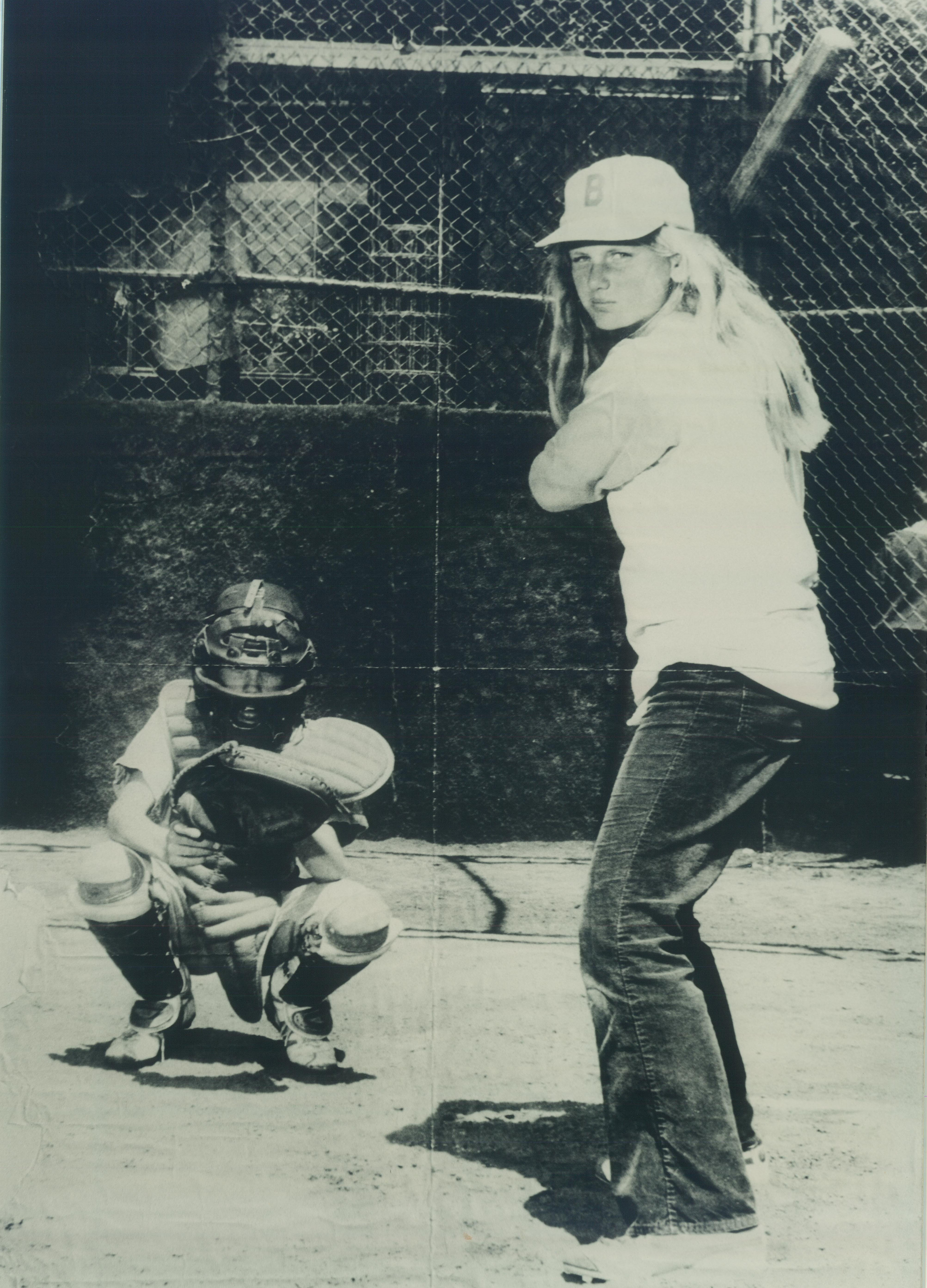
Jenny Fulle was the first girl to legally play Little League baseball in the United States.

Undeterred, Fulle wrote a letter to U.S. President Richard Nixon in March, stating that, "Most girls who even want to try out are good enough to at least make minor without any trouble. I sincerely hope you will do something." Two months later, she received a reply from Frederick T. Cioffi, an official with the Office of Civil Rights at the Department of Health, Education, and Welfare, stating that she may have a case if there was a connection between Little League and the use of public school facilities. Cioffi explained that the Office of Civil Rights was "in the process of preparing guidelines to handle this type of discrimination", which would apply to a Title IX amendment to the 1964 Civil Rights Act.

=== Mill Valley City Council and court ruling ===
In response to attempts by Fulle and several other Mill Valley girls to play Little League baseball, the Mill Valley Park and Recreation Commissioner Phyllis Joseph introduced a motion to the commission on June 11, 1973, to bar any organization from city playgrounds "that discriminates on the basis of race, religion, creed or sex". The motion failed by a vote of 3-2, thereby deciding not to order local Little League teams to admit girls.

Following this decision, Fulle and the other girls attended a Mill Valley city council meeting the following week, on June 18, assisted by the National Organization for Women (NOW) and the American Civil Liberties Union. Asked by Mayor Jean Barnard why she did not want to play softball with the other girls, Fulle replied: "Girls are expected to play with dolls. We don’t have that much experience playing baseball. But that doesn’t mean that we can't. I haven’t played with dolls since I was seven years old." After a 90-minute hearing, with a 3-2 vote, the council decided to inform the national Little League organization that it would not be allowed back to Mill Valley the following year unless it ended its ban of girls.

On December 3, 1973, following an appeal from the presidents of the two Mill Valley Little Leagues, R. Bruce Williams and Sam Loy, the Mill Valley City Council overturned their previous decision with a unanimous vote, allowing Little League teams to play one more season on city-owned playgrounds without allowing girls to play. This decision would have barred Fulle from playing in the Little League, since after that season she would be older than the maximum age allowed. In a letter dated December 13, 1973, ACLU lawyer Fred Hurvich volunteered to represent Fulle if she decided to take the matter to court. As a result of continued pressure on the council from the Mill Valley Human Rights Committee, on April 1, 1974, the Mill Valley City Council voted yet again, this time barring any organization discriminating on the basis of sex from city facilities, meaning the 350-member Little League of Marin County would have no place to play after July 1.

At that same meeting, Hurvich threatened to sue the City of Mill Valley to force out the sex-discrimination clause in Mill Valley's Little League so that girls could play that very summer. Their aim, according to Hurvich, was to "get Jenny onto a team this year."

The council maintained its decision to let the local Little League play for one more summer without girls. Hurvich implored the city to tell the Little League they had to allow Fulle to play, or be banned from Mill Valley parks. He promised to fight for the local Little League so that they did not lose their charter. "We are prepared to be in court on a day's notice if the National Little League acts against them," said Hurvich. Shortly thereafter, the National Little League threatened to disenfranchise the Bears if they let Fulle on the team, at which point Hurvich took the matter to court as promised.

On April 10, 1974, Superior Judge Joseph Wilson signed a temporary restraining order stating that the Mill Valley Little League baseball team, the Bears, could not bar Jenny Fulle from membership on account of her gender. He also banned the National Little League from releasing Mill Valley from their charter. After Wilson's judgment, Mill Valley Little League Commissioner, R. Bruce Williams said the organization had "wanted to allow Jenny to play, but we feared that without a court order the National Little League would lift our charter". Wilson's decision solved that problem. Four hours after the judge issued the restraining order, Fulle finally attended practice with the Bears.

=== National policy change ===
On June 12, 1974, Little League Baseball, Inc. announced it would open all competitions to both boys and girls. The decision stated that girls who wanted to play Little League must prove to local team coaches and management that they had "equal competency" with boys "in baseball skills, physical skills and other attributes used as the basis for team selection." In New York, NOW issued a statement praising Little League for correcting "its discriminatory policy toward girls." In the final week of December 1974, President Gerald Ford signed into law a bill that opened the Little League baseball program to girls. The wording in the League's charter was amended by changing the word "boys" wherever it appeared, to "young people".

In 1975, after Fulle had finished her first and final season of Little League, the Mill Valley American League President Robert Williams remarked that: "It worked out real well last year. It may have been a big thing over nothing... Jenny more than held her own. She was in the upper half of the league when comparing talent."

In 2000 Fulle was invited back to Mill Valley to lead the Little League's opening day parade and throw the first ball in celebration of the city's centennial.

== Visual effects producer ==
=== Early career ===
In 1980, aged 18, Fulle began her career in the film industry, starting as a janitor at George Lucas' Industrial Light and Magic (ILM), where her step-father worked as a landscape architect designer at Skywalker Ranch, and was also in charge of general services. She began in a temporary position substituting for an injured janitor, but was subsequently taken on permanently.

Fulle later became a visual effects production assistant on Star Trek IV: The Voyage Home. She continued working at ILM, moving up to the position of visual effects coordinator on Cocoon: The Return, Back to the Future Part III, Who Framed Roger Rabbit and Ghost.

=== Sony Pictures Imageworks ===
In the early 1990s, Fulle moved to Los Angeles to pursue her career in visual effects, landing her first visual effects producer credit on Batman Returns. She went on to produce for several different films and companies, including True Lies (for Boss Films, 1994), Apollo 13 (for Digital Domain, 1995), Eraser (as head of Warner Digital Studios, 1996), and MouseHunt (for DreamWorks SKG, 1997).

After a stint as a visual effects production executive at Disney, Fulle was appointed executive vice-president/executive producer for Sony Pictures Imageworks (SPI) in late 1997. For the next eleven years she oversaw and managed production, strategic planning and business development at SPI. In 2004 she was promoted to the position of Executive VP of Production. At SPI, Fulle worked on over 30 films, including What Lies Beneath, Spider-Man 1, 2, and 3, The Lord of the Rings: The Two Towers, The Chronicles of Narnia, The Aviator, I Am Legend, Open Season, and Surf's Up.

During her time at SPI, Fulle was recognized by various trades and organizations. In 2006, she was named in Variety's "Women's Impact report" for her work overseeing the animated movies Open Season and Surf's Up, while also running the production department at Imageworks. In October the same year, she was listed at #11 on The Hollywood Reporter's "digital 50". Also in 2006, Fulle was nominated for the Los Angeles Business Journal's 2006 "Women Making a Difference Awards". In 2008, the Professional Organization of Women in Entertainment Reaching Up (Power Up) named Fulle as one of its "Ten Amazing Women", honoring successful gay women in the entertainment industry.

Toward the end of her tenure at SPI, Fulle helped launch Sony's expansion into the Indian visual effects and animation market, resulting in the establishment of Imageworks India in 2007, with Fulle serving on the board until she left Sony two years later to start her own company, the Creative-Cartel.

=== The Creative-Cartel ===
The Creative-Cartel was conceived as leaner form of production company, with traditional brick and mortar facilities and heavy overheads replaced by a core team of asset managers, production coordinators, and project managers who could work with different VFX houses chosen specifically for each project.

The Creative-Cartel's first project, Priest, used around a dozen VFX vendors from England, Australia, the US and Canada, with Fulle's company acting as a coordinating hub for all the VFX on the film. Since then, The Creative-Cartel has produced visual effects for films such as Ghost Rider: Spirit of Vengeance, Ted, and After Earth.
