= Sebastián Martínez =

Sebastián Martínez may refer to:

- Sebastián Martínez (actor) (born 1981), Colombian actor
- Sebastián Martínez (footballer, born 1977), Austrian former footballer
- Sebastián Martínez (footballer, born 1993), Chilean footballer
- Sebastián Martínez (footballer, born 1983), Uruguayan footballer
- Sebastián Martínez (footballer, born 2001), Mexican footballer
- Sebastián Martínez (footballer, born 2003), Mexican footballer

== See also ==
- Daniel Sebastián Martínez (born 1981), Uruguayan footballer
