= Sebastiaan Bökkerink =

Dutch footballer

Personal information
- Date of birth: 23 October 1994 (age 32)
- Position: Defender

Team information
- Current team: Quick '20
- Number: 18

Youth career
- –2012: Quick '20
- 2012–2013: De Graafschap

Senior career*
Years	Team	Apps	(Gls)
2011–2012	Quick '20	1	(0)
2013–2015	HSC '21	36	(4)
2015–2016	Quick '20		
2016–2017	Achilles '29	3	(0)
2017–2018	Quick '20	31	(2)
- * Club domestic league appearances and goals as of 27 May 2017

Sebastiaan "Bas" Bökkerink (born 23 October 1994) is a Dutch retired football player.

== Club career ==
He made his professional debut in the Eerste Divisie for Achilles '29 on 30 September 2016 in a game against VVV-Venlo.Bökkerink left Quick '20 in 2018.

After retiring, he started to run a walk-up fast food restaurant of the automat type in Enschede with his brother.
