= Sebastian Bonau =

German politician (born 1989)

Member of the Landtag of Schleswig-Holstein
- Incumbent
- Assumed office 1 March 2026
- Preceded by: Anna Langsch

Personal details
- Born: 6 February 1989 (age 37)
- Party: Alliance 90/The Greens (since 2020)

Sebastian Bonau (born 6 February 1989) is a German politician serving as a member of the Landtag of Schleswig-Holstein since 2026. From 2024 to 2025, he served as chairman of Alliance 90/The Greens in Schleswig-Flensburg.
