= Sevastyan Tanatar =

Russian chemist (1849–1917)

Sevastyan Moiseevich Tanatar (Russian: Севастьян Моисеевич Танатар, Ukrainian: Севастян Мойсейович Танатар; 7 (19) October 1849, Odesa – 30 November (19 December) 1917, Odesa) was a Russian chemist.

He was born into a family of Karaite merchants in Odesa. When he was 14, his family moved to Simferopol, Crimea, where he graduated from the Simferopol gymnasium three years later. In 1867, he returned to Odesa to attend Novorossiyskiy University (now Odesa University), from where he graduated in 1872. In 1873–1874 he studied abroad. He later returned to Odesa University, where he achieved the rank of a Full Professor in 1896.

Tanatar made several pioneering contributions to chemistry. In 1880, he showed that fumaric and maleic acid, upon oxidation, yield two isomeric hydroxycarboxylic acids, later shown to be racemic and mesotartaric acids. In 1895, he accomplished the transformation of cyclopropene into propylene at high temperature. In 1898–99 he produced perborates and percarbonates by electrolysis. Tanatar also discovered compounds of hydrogen peroxide with Na_{2}CO (1899), Na_{2}SO_{4} (1901), and other salts and with urea (1908). He also made significant contributions to nitrogen chemistry, such as industrial manufacturing of ammonia, nitrous acid and nitric acid, determination of the heat capacity and the atomic mass of beryllium, and the invention of gas mask.

== Bibliography ==
- On the structure of fumaric and maleic acid (Master's thesis; Odesa 1880)
- On the question and reasons of isomerism of fumaric and maleic acids (PhD dissertation; Odesa 1891)
- Some thermochemical data for succinic and isosuccinic acids (Journal of the Russian Physico-Chemical Society, 1889, v. 21)
- Some thermochemical data for organic acids (ib ., 1891, vol. 23)
- A note on Osipov's article on the probable heat of hydration of maleic anhydride (ib., 1891, vol. 23)
- The effect of water on bromosuccinic acid and its potassium salt (ib., 1891, 23)
- Heat of dissolution and neutralization of alpha-dibromyropionic acid (ib., 1892, vol. 24)
- Thermochemical data for beta-dibromyropionic acid (ib., 1892, vol. 24)
- Two modifications of benzophenone ( ib., 1892, vol. 24)
- Two modifications of chloroacetic acid (ib., 1892, vol. 24)
- On two modifications of iodine chloride (ib., 1893, vol. 25)
- Reaction of the formation of nitrous acid (ib., 1893, vol. 25)
- On the Arrhenius theory (ib., 1894, vol. 26)
- The transformation of trimethylene into propylene (ib., 1895, vol. 27)
- On free nitrous acid (ib., 1896, vol. 28)
- On the process of soda formation in nature (ib., 1896, vol. 28)
- Decomposition products of fumaric hydroxylamine (ib., 1896, vol. 28)
- Amber hydroxylamine and products of its decomposition (ib., 1897, v. 29)
- To the theory of A.A. Yakovkin (ib., 1897, vol. 29)
- A note on metaphosphoric acids (ib., 1898, vol. 30)
- Thermochemical studies in alcoholic solutions (ib., 1897, vol. 29)
- Depression some electrolytes and non-electrolytes in mixed solvents (ib., 1895, vol. 27)
- Specific gravity of isomeric acids (ib., 1890, vol. 22)
- Ueber Superoxide (Berichte d. deutsch. Chem. Gesellschaft, 1900)
- Zur Frage betreffs der Umwandung des Trimethylens in Propylen (ib., 1899)
- Percarbonate (ib., 1899)
- Eine neue Bildungsweise der Stickstoffwasserstoffsaure (ib., 1899)
- Zur Kenntniss des Hydroxylamins (ib., 1899)
- Das Verhalten der Halogensauerstoffsauren dem Wasserstoffhyperoxyd gegenuber (ib., 1899)
- Ueber das Verhalten der Maleinsaure beim Erhitzen (ib., 1894)
- Zur theorie derischen elektration (Zeitschrift für Physikalische Chemie, 1894)
- Die Losungs- und Neutralisationswarme des Nitroharnstoffes und seines Kaliumsalzes (ib., 1896)
- Salzbildung in alkoholischer Losung (ib., 18 98)
- Perborate und ihre Konstitution (ib., 1898)
- Notiz uber Perborate (ib., 1898)
- Ueber die Verbrennung de Gase (ib., 1900)
- Ueber Perborate (Zeitschrift fur anorgan. Chemie, 1901)
- Bleisuboxyd (ib., 1901)
- Cadmiumsuboxyd (ib., 1901)
- Wismuthsuboxyd (ib., 1901)
- Cement of the water supply system of ancient Chersonesos (Notes of the Novorossiysk Society, 1893)
- Limestone from the vicinity of Bakhchisarai, suitable for the preparation of hydraulic cement (ib., 1893)
- Theory of solutions (Odesa, 1895),
- A practical guide to thermochemistry (translation of the work of Berthelot, Odesa, 1894)
