= Bastien Geiger =

Swiss footballer (born 1985)

Personal information
- Full name: Bastien Geiger
- Date of birth: 26 February 1985 (age 41)
- Place of birth: Switzerland
- Height: 1.78 m (5 ft 10 in)
- Position: Right back

Youth career
- Sion
- Neuchâtel Xamax

Senior career*
| Years | Team | Apps | (Gls) |
| 2004–2007 | Neuchâtel Xamax | 48 | (1) |
| 2007–2008 | Sion | 28 | (0) |
| 2009–2012 | Neuchâtel Xamax | 40 | (2) |
| 2012–2014 | Biel-Bienne | 33 | (0) |
- * Club domestic league appearances and goals

Bastien Geiger (born 26 February 1985) is a Swiss former footballer who played as a defender.

== Career ==
After leaving his contract with FC Sion on 27 November 2008, he signed with Neuchâtel Xamaxon 17 December 2008, returning to his youth club.

In July 2012, Geiger joined Swiss Challenge League club Biel-Bienne on a one-year deal.

== Personal life ==
He is the son of Alain Geiger, who was part of the first Switzerland team to qualify for a World Cup since 1966 when they achieved qualification for the 1994 World Cup under coach Roy Hodgson.
