= Sebastian Shaw =

Sebastian Shaw is the name of:

- Sebastian Shaw (actor) (1905–1994), English film and stage actor
- Sebastian Francis Shaw (born 1957), Roman Catholic metropolitan archbishop of Lahore
- Sebastian Shaw (character), a character from the X-Men comic books by Marvel Comics
- Sebastian Shaw (serial killer) (1967–2021), Vietnamese-born American serial killer
- Sebastian Shaw, British TV actor on Coronation Street
