= Bastien Bernard =

French footballer (born 1976)

Personal information
- Full name: Bastien Bernard
- Date of birth: November 6, 1976 (age 49)
- Place of birth: Rochefort, France
- Height: 1.70 m (5 ft 7 in)
- Position: Midfielder

Senior career*
Years	Team	Apps	(Gls)
1996–1999	Chamois Niortais	9	(0)
- * Club domestic league appearances and goals

Bastien Bernard (born November 6, 1976) is a French retired professional footballer. He played as a midfielder.
