= Hilda Bastian =

Australian activist

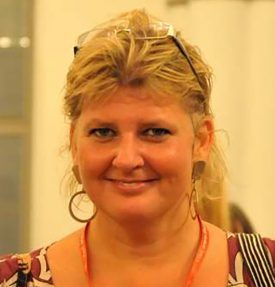
- Hilda Bastian
- Born: Australia
- Occupations: Consumer health activist; scientific communication

Hilda Bastian is a health consumer advocate. Starting in Australia in the 1980s and 1990s and moving to Europe and the USA, she is involved in evidence-based medicine and communicating medical science to the public.

She was a founding member of the Cochrane Collaboration and worked at the National Institute of Health in the United States on PubMed Health. Her other activities include blogging and drawing cartoons.

== Personal life and education ==
In 1994, Bastian had no formal qualifications. However, she became interested in consumer activism and science, particularly related to health. She completed a PhD from Bond University in 2020 on factors affecting systematic reviews.

== Career ==
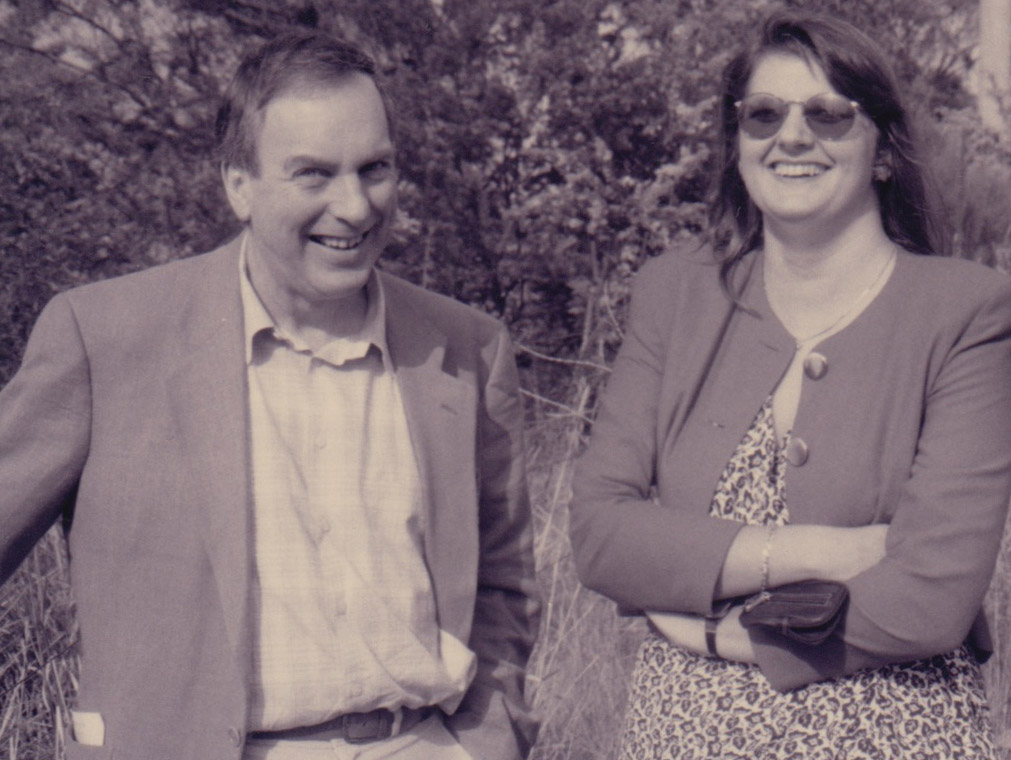
Iain Chalmers (left) with Bastian, 1994

Bastian spent 20 years as a health consumer advocate in Australia. She became an expert in the Australian health care system, advising doctors and policy makers in the area. She founded two bodies, Homebirth Australia, and the network, Maternity Alliance, advocating for more homebirths in Australia. Later Bastian learned that at this time in Australia, infant mortalities were higher from homebirths than births in hospital. This led to her career in consumer health activism, especially the communication complex medical issues to the public.

As a health care advocate, she was appointed to the National Health and Medical Research Council (NHMRC) committee and the Australian Gastroenterology Institute. Apart from the earlier maternity bodies, Bastian was a member of the founding board of the Consumers’ Health Forum of Australia, and the Cochrane Collaboration. By 1999, Bastian had added inclusion of unpaywalled and plain language summaries to as a routine part of Cochrane's systematic reviews.

She left Australia to work in Germany in 2004 and became Head of the Health Information Department at the newly formed German Institute for Quality and Efficiency in Health Care in Cologne.

Moving to the USA in 2011, she worked at the National Center for Biotechnology Information on PubMed Health, a project focusing on clinical effectiveness and research. and then at PubMed Commons, an experiment in post-publication commenting on biomedical publications that started in 2013 and discontinued in 2018 because of low levels of participation and development of alternative on-line locations for comments. She writes an independent blog within the PLOS Blogs Network. These are illustrated with her own cartoons.

Bastian has also written for Scientific American, an American popular science magazine. She is a member of the editorial board of Drug and Therapeutic Bulletin.

She returned to Australia in 2018.
