= Sebastiano Bianchi =

Italian engraver

Sebastiano Bianchi was an Italian engraver, active c.1580. He produced plates of devotional subjects. Among others is a print representing the Emblems of our Saviour's Sufferings, with Angels.
