= Mélanie Fazi =

French novelist and translator

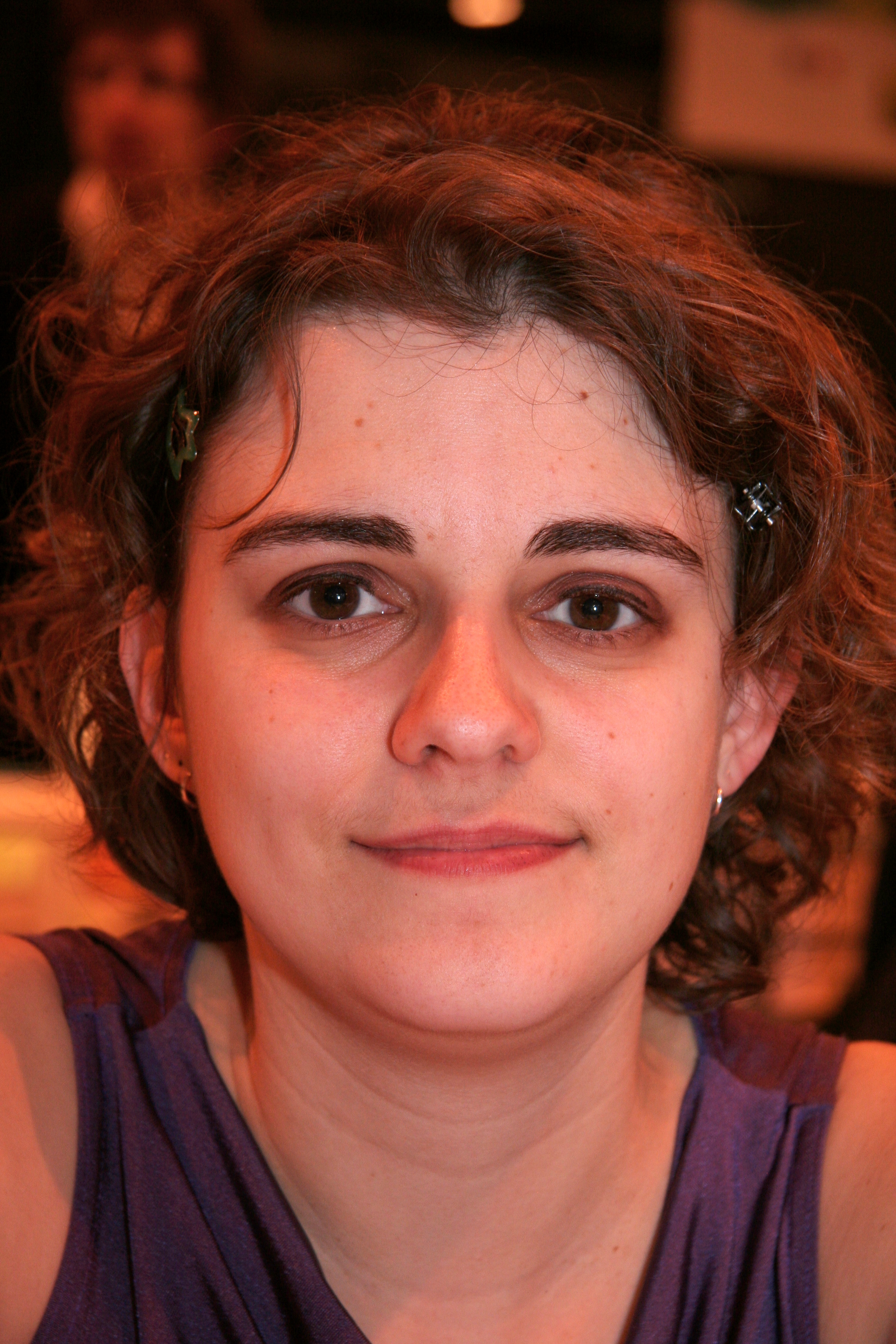
- Mélanie Fazi at the Salon du livre de Paris in March 2008
- Born: Mélanie Fazi; 29 November 1976 (age 49); Dunkirk, France
- Occupations: Novelist and translator
- Writing career
- Genre: Fiction
- Subject: Fantasy
- Notable works: Trois pépins du fruit des morts; Serpentine; Notre-Dame aux Écailles; Arlis des Forains
- Notable awards: Prix Merlin in 2002 and 2004; Prix Masterton in 2005 and 2009; Grand Prix de l'Imaginaire in 2005 and 2007
- Website: www.melaniefazi.net

Mélanie Fazi (born 29 November 1976) is a French novelist and translator specialising in fantasy fiction. As well as writing award-winning fiction of her own she has translated works by Lois McMaster Bujold, Elizabeth Moon, Poppy Z. Brite and Graham Joyce into French for Éditions Bragelonne, a French publisher. In 2020, Fazi announced on her blog that she had been diagnosed with autism.

== Personal life ==
Fazi was born in Dunkirk, France to an Italian father and French mother.

== Notable awards ==
- 2002: Prix Merlin ((in French) "Merlin Prize") for Matilda (original novel)
- 2004: Prix Merlin for Trois Pépins du fruit des morts ((in French) "Three Seeds of the Fruit of the Dead") (original novel)
- 2005: Prix Masterton ((in French) "Masterton Prize") for Arlis des forains ((in French) "Arlis fairground") (original novel)
- 2005: Grand Prix de l'Imaginaire ((in French) "Grand Prize of the Imagination") for Serpentine (original novel)
- 2007: Grand Prix de l'Imaginaire for Lignes de vie ((in French) "Lifelines") (translation)
- 2009: Prix Masterton for Notre-Dame-aux-Ecailles ((in French) "Our Lady of Scales") (original novel)
- 2010: Prix Masterton for Miroir de porcelaine ((in French) "Porcelain Mirror") (original novel)
