= Donald N. Bastian =

Canadian bishop

Donald N. Bastian was a retired Bishop of The Free Methodist Church USA. He served from 1974 to 1990 as one of five bishops, with primary oversight of Free Methodist churches in Canada. In 1990 he was elected the first bishop of the newly formed General Conference in Canada when three long-standing annual conferences were granted the right to form such a conference. He died on April 6th, 2024, at the age of 98.

Prior to his service as a bishop of the church he served three Free Methodist congregations—Lexington, Kentucky, during his seminary years (1953-1956), New Westminster, B.C. (1956-1961), and the Greenville College church in Greenville, Illinois (1961-1974), totalling 21 years.

Bastian has authored several books, including: Belonging, the long-used and often-updated membership training book of the Free Methodist Church; God's House Rules, on biblical principles for family life; The Pastor's First Love: And Other Essays on a High and Holy Calling; and From Kitchen Chair to Pulpit: A Memoir of Family, Faith, and Ministry. Bastian has also written hundreds of articles, appearing primarily in Light and Life, the magazine of the Free Methodist Church, as well as in Christianity Today, The Lutheran, and The Upper Room.

Bastian earned his B.A. from Greenville College and the B.D. (comparable to today's M.Div.) from Asbury Theological Seminary and has been awarded four honorary doctorates.

Beginning in the late 1980s, Bastian and President Neil Hightower of the Canadian Nazarene College worked with Canadian denominational leaders to establish a chair in Wesleyan studies at Tyndale Seminary, Canada's largest Protestant seminary. The chair was inaugurated in 1993 and named the Donald N. and Kathleen G. Bastian Chair of Wesley Studies.

In 2016 Greenville University (formerly Greenville College) established the Donald N. and Kathleen G. Bastian School of Theology, Philosophy, and Ministry, as well as the Donald N. Bastian Chair of Pastoral Theology and Christian Ministry.

Bastian, who was born in Estevan, Saskatchewan, married the former Kathleen Swallow and the two of them had four children. They lived in Mississauga, Ontario.
