= San Sebastiano =

San Sebastiano (Italian for "Saint Sebastian") can refer to:

- San Sebastiano Curone, a comune in Piedmont, Italy
- San Sebastiano da Po, a comune in Piedmont, Italy
- San Sebastiano al Vesuvio, a comune in Campania, Italy
- San Sebastiano (Biella), a church in Biella, Italy
- San Sebastiano (Milan), a church in Milan, Italy
- San Sebastiano (Mantua), a church in Mantua, Italy
- San Sebastiano fuori le mura, a church in Rome, Italy
- San Sebastiano al Palatino, a church in Rome, Italy
- San Sebastiano, Venice, a church in Venice, Italy
- San Sebastiano, Verona, a former church in Verona, Italy
