= Sebastian Watermeier =

German politician (born 1984)

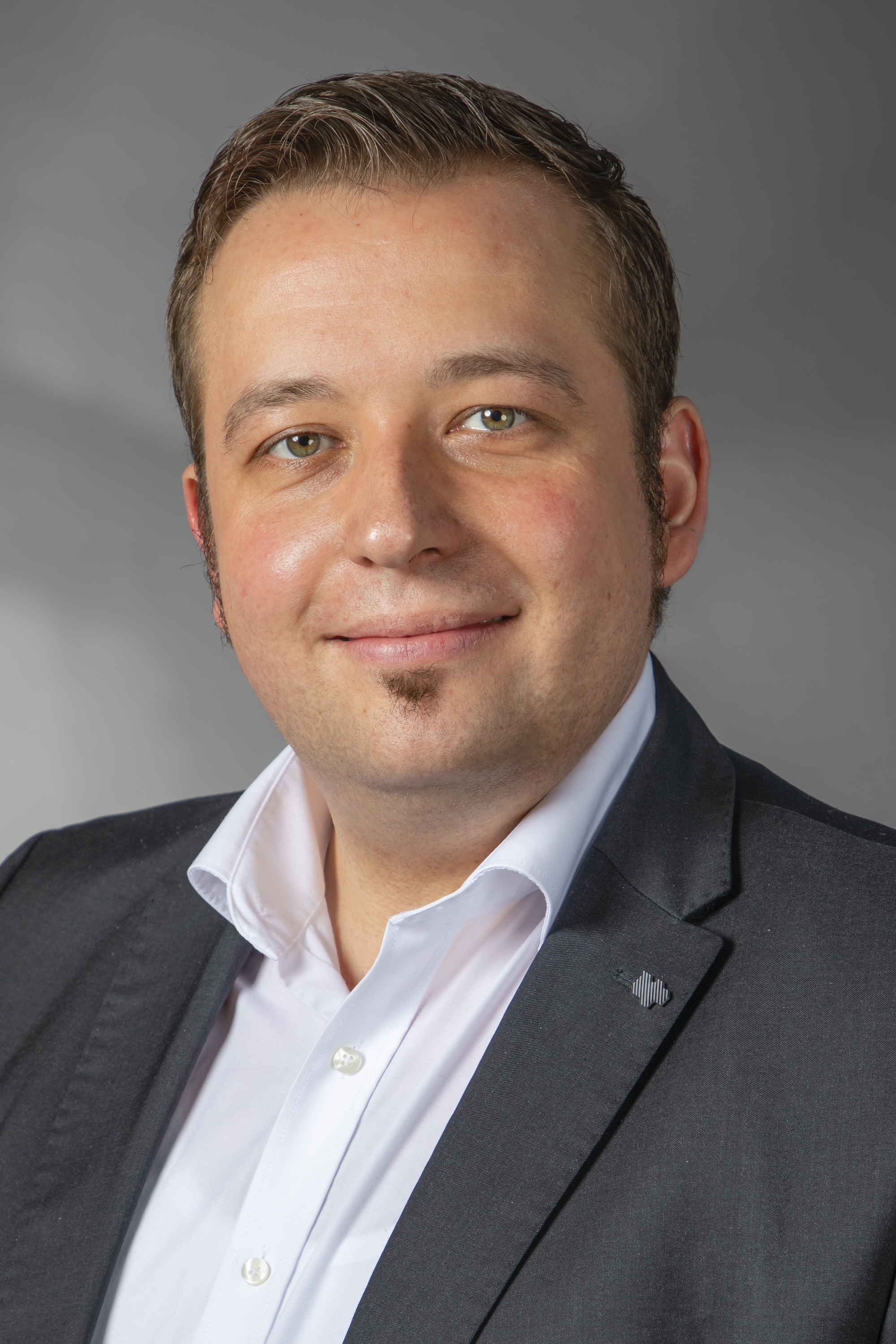
- Watermeier in 2019

Member of the Landtag of North Rhine-Westphalia
- Incumbent
- Assumed office 1 June 2017
- Preceded by: Markus Töns
- Constituency: Gelsenkirchen II

Personal details
- Born: 16 December 1984 (age 41)
- Party: Social Democratic Party (since 2005)

Sebastian Watermeier (born 16 December 1984) is a German politician serving as a member of the Landtag of North Rhine-Westphalia since 2017. From 2008 to 2011, he served as chairman of Jusos in Gelsenkirchen.
