= Sevastyanov =

Sevastyanov (Russian: Севастьянов), femonine: Sevastyanova, is a Russian patronymic surname derived from the male given name Sevastyan (Sebastian) and means literally Sebastian's. It may refer to:

- Boris Sevastyanov (born 1983), Ukrainian singer and composer
- Karolina Sevastyanova (born 1995), Russian group rhythmic gymnast
- Nikolay Sevastyanov (born 1961), Russian engineer
- Pavel Sevastyanov, Soviet football manager
- Vitaly Sevastyanov (1935–2010), Soviet cosmonaut
- Vsevolod Sevastyanov (1938–2026), Russian politician

== See also ==
- Sevastyanenko
