= Bastian Hartmann =

German politician (born 1984)

Member of the Landtag of North Rhine-Westphalia
- Incumbent
- Assumed office 1 June 2022
- Preceded by: Karsten Rudolph
- Constituency: Bochum II

Personal details
- Born: 4 December 1984 (age 41)
- Party: Social Democratic Party (since 2007)

Bastian Hartmann (born 4 December 1984) is a German politician serving as a member of the Landtag of North Rhine-Westphalia since 2022. He has been a city councillor of Bochum since 2014.
