= Jean-Sébastien =

Jean-Sébastien is a French masculine given name. Notable people with the name include:

- Jean-Sébastien Aubin (born 1977), Canadian professional ice hockey goaltender
- Jean-Sébastien Bach, francized name of Johann Sebastian Bach (1685–1750)
- Jean-Sébastien Fecteau (born 1975), Canadian figure skater
- Jean-Sébastien Giguère (born 1977), retired French-Canadian professional ice hockey player
- Jean-Sébastien Girard (born 1975), Québec comedian, host and commentator
- Jean-Sébastien Jaurès (born 1977), French football player
- Jean-Sébastien Lavoie (born 1978), French Canadian singer featured on Nouvelle Star
- Jean-Sébastien Vialatte (born 1951), member of the National Assembly of France

== See also ==
- Jean (male given name)
- Sébastien
