= Sevasti (given name) =

Sevasti is a given name. Notable people with the name include:

- Sevasti Kallisperi (1858–1953), first Greek woman to attain a university degree
- Sevasti Qiriazi (ca. 1871–1949), Albanian patriot
- Sevasti Todua (born 1976), Georgian footballer
