= Sebastian Fülle =

German basketball player (born 1992)

No. 10 – TKS 49ers
- Position: Shooting guard
- League: ProB

Personal information
- Born: 27 July 1992 (age 34) Berlin, Germany
- Listed height: 6 ft 4 in (1.93 m)
- Listed weight: 187 lb (85 kg)

Career information
- Playing career: 2013–present

Career history
- 2013–2014: Alba Berlin
- 2018–present: TKS 49ers

Sebastian Fülle (born 27 July 1992) is a German professional basketball player who plays for the TKS 49ers of the German ProB league where he has been team captain. He formerly played for Alba Berlin of the German Basketball League. Fülle made his debut with Alba Berlin-2, Pro-B, during the 2009-10 season.
