= Sebastian Wippel =

German politician (born 1982)

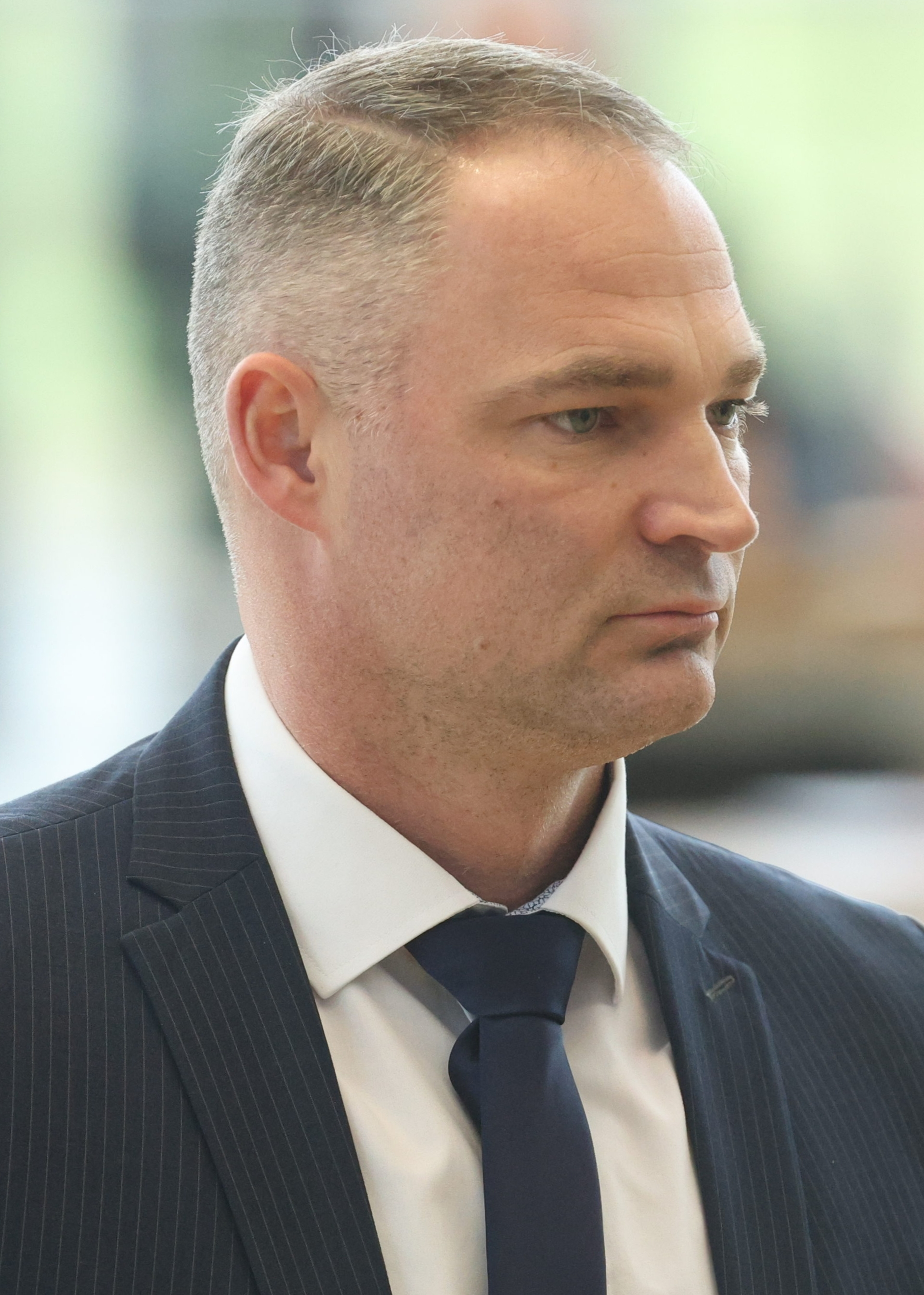
- Wippel in 2024

Member of the Landtag of Saxony
- Incumbent
- Assumed office 29 September 2014

Personal details
- Born: 28 November 1982 (age 43) Görlitz
- Party: Alternative for Germany (since 2013)
- Other political affiliations: Free Democratic Party (2010–2013)

Sebastian Edgar Wippel (born 28 November 1982 in Görlitz) is a German politician serving as a member of the Landtag of Saxony since 2014. He has been a member of the Alternative for Germany since 2013, and was a member of the Free Democratic Party from 2010 to 2013.
