= Kati Sebestyén =

Kati Sebestyén, a native of Hungary, is professor of violin and head of the string department at the Royal Conservatory of Brussels. She has played as a part of the Haydn Quartet and leads the Sebestyén String Ensemble.
