= Sébastien =

- Pronunciation: French pronunciation: [sebastjɛ̃]
- Gender: Male

Origin
- Origin: Latin and Greek
- Meaning: "from Sebaste"
- Region of origin: French

Other names
- Related names: Sebastian, Sebastianus

Sébastien is a common French given name. It is a French form of the Latin name Sebastianus meaning "from Sebaste". Sebaste was a common placename in classical Antiquity, derived from the Greek word σεβαστος, or sebastos, meaning "venerable."

Notable people named Sébastien or Sebastien include:

== Military ==
- Sébastien Le Prestre de Vauban (1633–1707), a Marshal of France and the foremost military engineer of his age
- Sébastien Pontault de Beaulieu (died 1674), French engineer considered to be the first military topographer

== Arts and entertainment ==
- Sébastien Agius (born 1983), French singer, winner of the first French X Factor
- Sébastien Akchoté-Bozović (born 1981), French musician, also known as Sebastian
- Sébastien Aurillon (born 1973) French visual artist and gallerist
- Sébastien Bourdon (1616–1671), French painter and engraver
- Sébastien Japrisot (1931–2003), French author, screenwriter and film director
- Sebastien Grainger (born 1979), Canadian singer and musician
- Sébastien Izambard (born 1973), French singer and musician. Member of the classical crossover quartet Il Divo
- Sébastien Lefebvre (born 1981), Canadian musician
- Sébastien Léger (born 1979), French house DJ and producer
- Sébastien Tellier (born 1975), French singer, songwriter and multi-instrumentalist
- Sébastien Vaniček, French filmmaker

== Sports ==
- Sébastien Bassong (born 1986), French football defender
- Sébastien Bourdais (born 1979), French 4-time ChampCar champion and Superleague race car driver
- Sébastien Bordeleau (born 1975), Canadian National Hockey League player
- Sébastien Buemi (born 1988), Swiss former Formula One race car driver
- Sébastien Caron (born 1980), Canadian former National Hockey League goalie
- Sébastien Chabal (born 1977), French rugby union player
- Sébastien Chavanel (born 1981), French road bicycle racer
- Sébastien Demers (born 1979), Canadian professional boxer
- Sébastien Enjolras (1976–1997), French racing driver
- Sébastien Faure (1858–1942), French anarchist
- Sébastien Foucan (born 1974), French freerunner and actor
- Sébastien Fournier-Bidoz (born 1976), French alpine skier
- Sébastien Frey (born 1980), French football goalkeeper
- Sébastien Grosjean (born 1978), French retired tennis player
- Sébastien Hinault (born 1974), French road racing cyclist
- Sébastien Lareau (born 1973), Canadian retired tennis player
- Sébastien Loeb (born 1974), French rally car driver
- Sébastien Ogier (born 1983), French rally car driver
- Sébastien Rosseler (born 1981), Belgian road racing cyclist
- Sébastien Rouault (born 1986), French freestyle swimmer
- Sébastien Squillaci (born 1980), French football defender
- Sébastien Vorbe (born 1976), Haitian soccer player

== Politics ==
- Sébastien Lecornu (born 1986), French politician, French prime minister since 2025
- Sébastien Peytavie (born 1982), French politician
- Sébastien Rome (born 1978), French politician
- Sébastien Vincini (born 1978), French politician

== Other ==
- Sébastien Bottin (1764–1853), French statistician and politician
- Sébastien Érard (1752–1831), French musical instrument maker and pioneer of the modern piano
- Sebastian Gryphius or Sébastien Gryphe (c. 1492–1556), German bookseller, printer and humanist
- Sebastien Manrique, Portuguese missionary and traveler to India during 1628–1643
- Sébastien Michaëlis, French inquisitor and prior in the 16th and 17th centuries
- Sébastien Nasra, Founder of M for Montreal
- Sébastien Rale (1657–1724), French Jesuit missionary and lexicographer in North America
- Sébastien Vaillant (1669–1722), French botanist

== See also ==
- Jean-Sébastien
- Sebastian (name)
