= Sebastian Killinger =

German politician (born 1986)

Member of the Landtag of Saxony-Anhalt
- Assuming office 6 October 2026
- Succeeding: Chris Schulenburg
- Constituency: Havelberg-Osterburg

Personal details
- Born: 1986 (age 39–40)
- Party: Alternative for Germany

Sebastian Killinger (born 1986) is a German politician who was elected member of the Landtag of Saxony-Anhalt in 2026. He has been a city councillor of Tangermünde since 2024.
