= Sebastian, or, Virtue Rewarded =

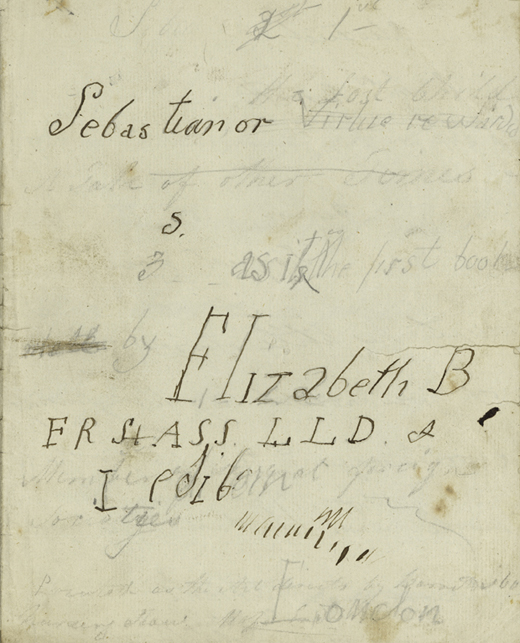
"Sebastian, or, Virtue Rewarded".

"Sebastian, or, Virtue Rewarded" is the name of an unpublished poem written around 1815 by the 9-year-old Elizabeth Barrett, later famous as Elizabeth Barrett Browning. The autographed manuscript of the poem is held in the Henry W. and Albert A. Berg Collection of English and American Literature in the New York Public Library. Note that the ambitious young Elizabeth signs herself F. R. S. (Fellow of the Royal Society) on the cover shown right.
