= Annunciation (El Greco, Madrid) =

1609 painting by El Greco

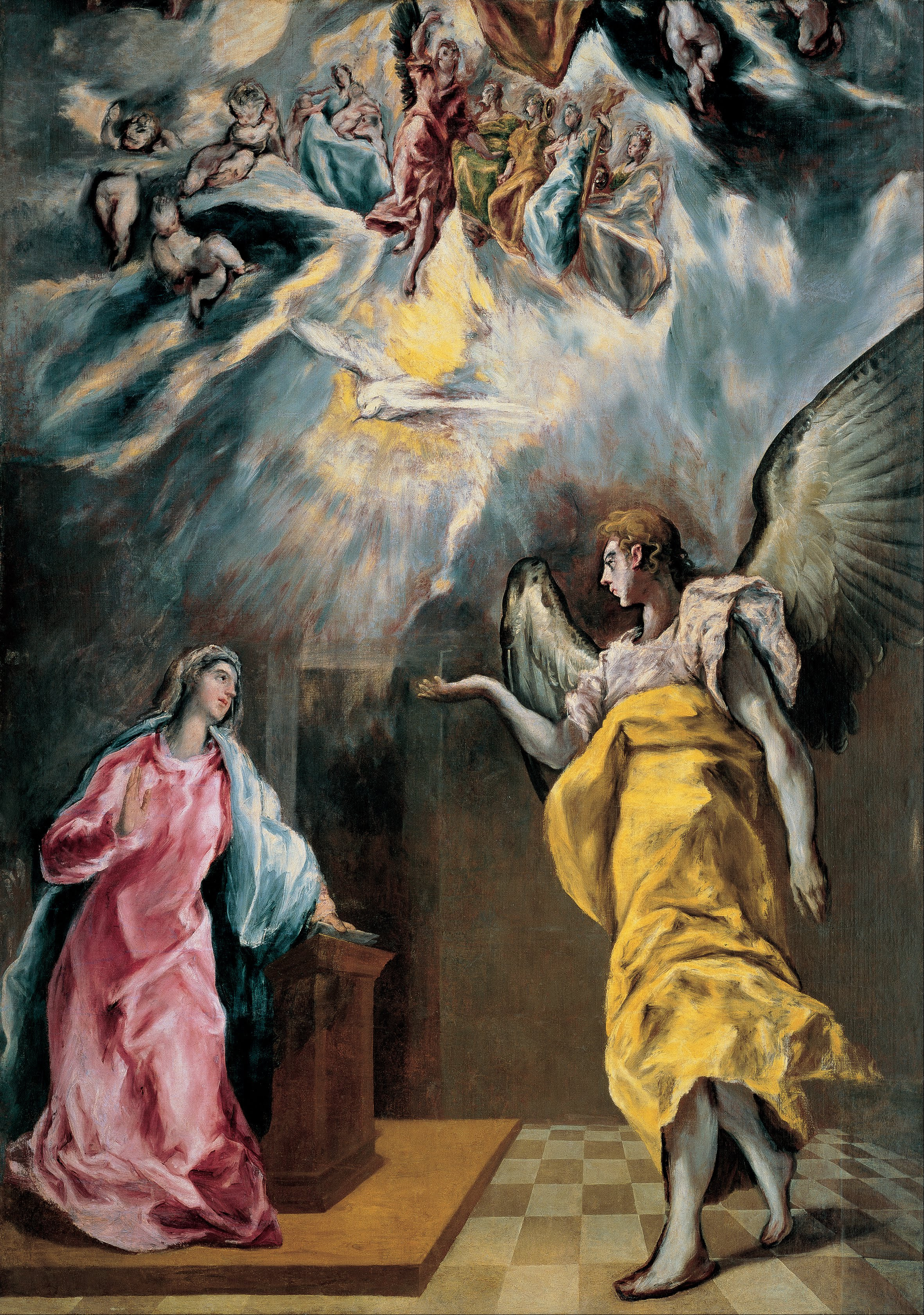
- Artist: El Greco
- Year: 1609
- Medium: oil on canvas
- Dimensions: 294 cm × 204 cm (116 in × 80 in)
- Location: Private collection, Madrid

Annunciation is a 1609 work by El Greco, now in a private collection in Madrid. It is a variant on his work on the same theme as part of the Doña María de Aragón Altarpiece. The painter died in April 1614 and the work may have been completed by his son Jorge Manuel after that date. It is not an independent composition but a cut-down fragment of the whole, designed for and installed in the chapel of the Hospital de Tavera.

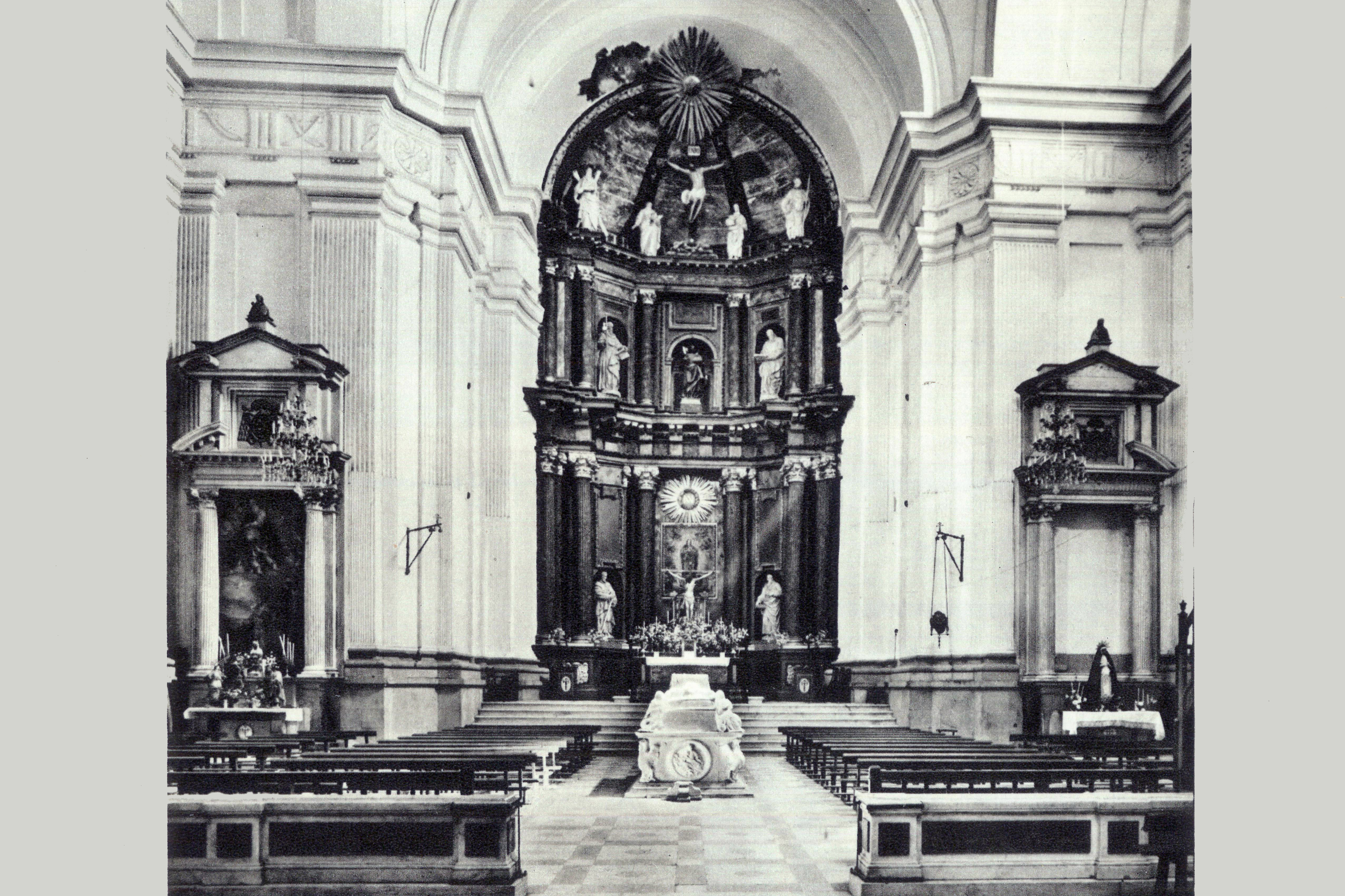
Old photo of chapel interior

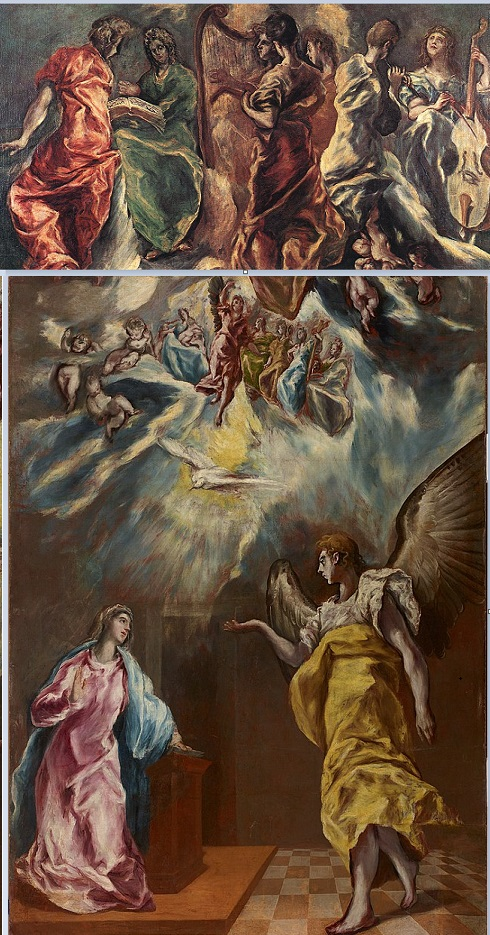
Annunciation reconstruction with Concert of Angels

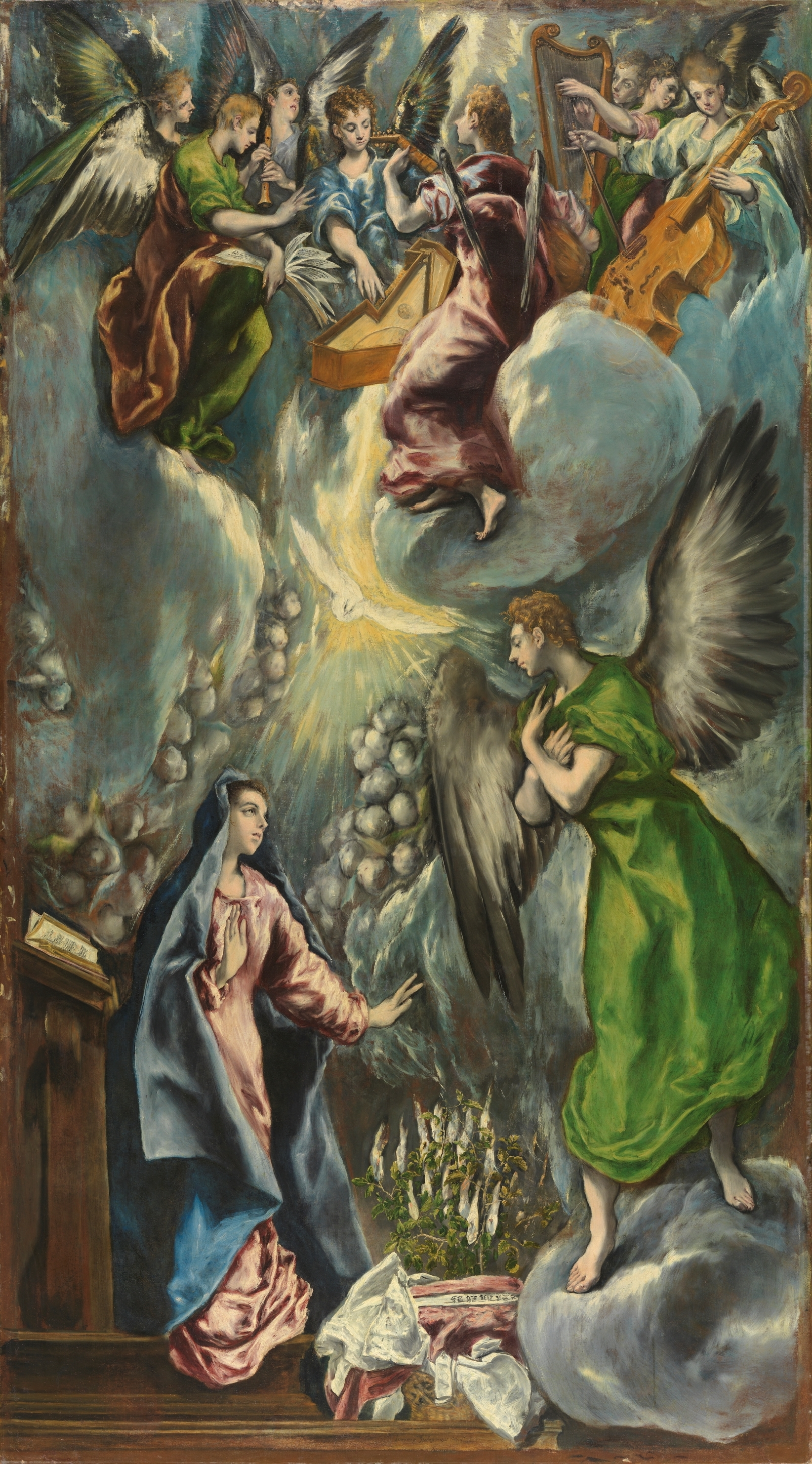
Prado version of the Annunciation

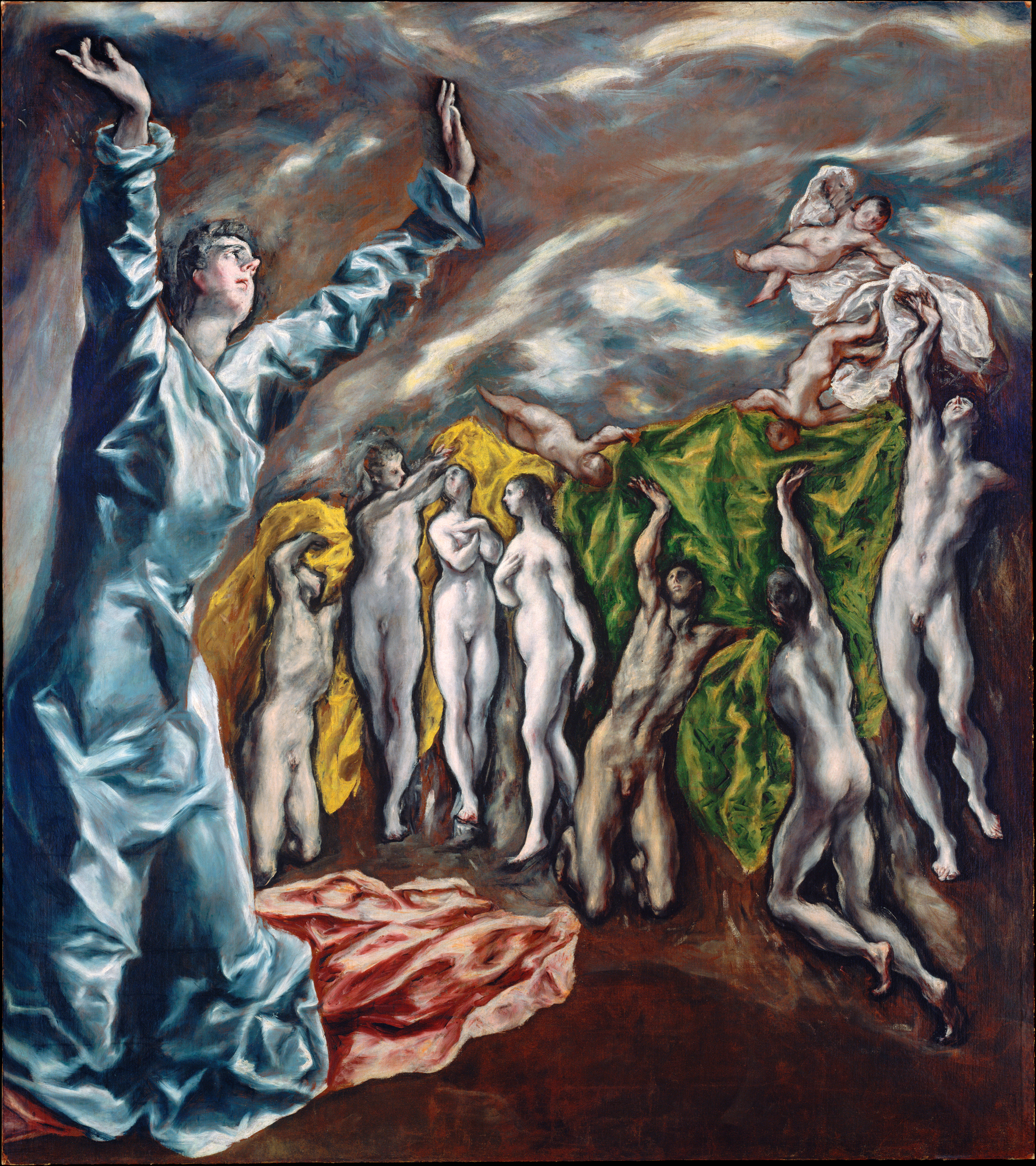
Vision of St John (also cut down, upper portion unknown)

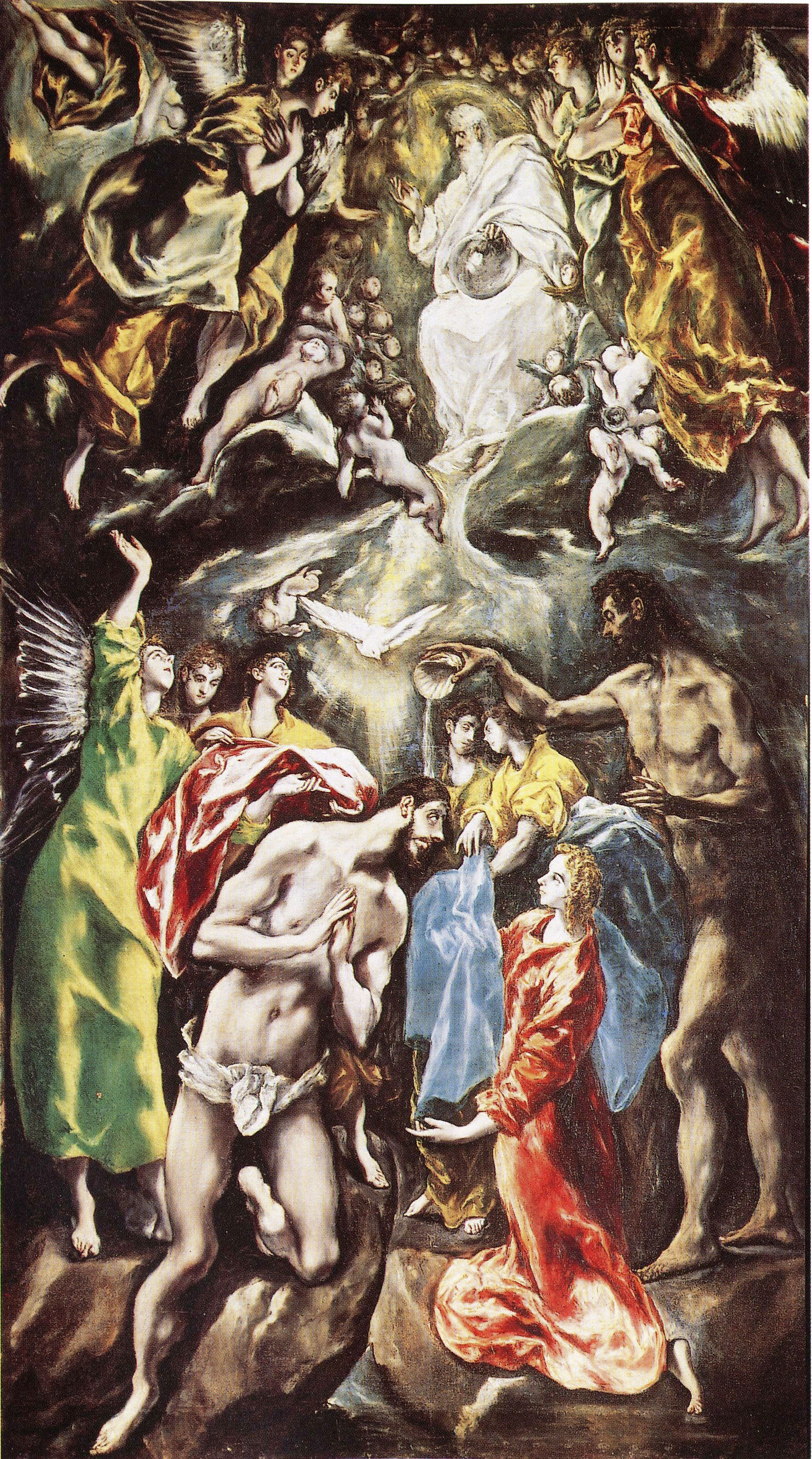
Baptism of Christ (still in Toledo)

== Bibliography (in Spanish) ==
- ÁLVAREZ LOPERA, José, El Greco, Madrid, Arlanza, 2005, Biblioteca «Descubrir el Arte», (colección «Grandes maestros»). ISBN 84-9550-344-1.
- SCHOLZ-HÄNSEL, Michael, El Greco, Colonia, Taschen, 2003. ISBN 978-3-8228-3173-1.
- ArteHistoria.com. «Anunciación». [Consulta: 09.01.2011].
