= Concert of Angels =

1608 painting by El Greco

- Concierto de ángeles (Spanish)
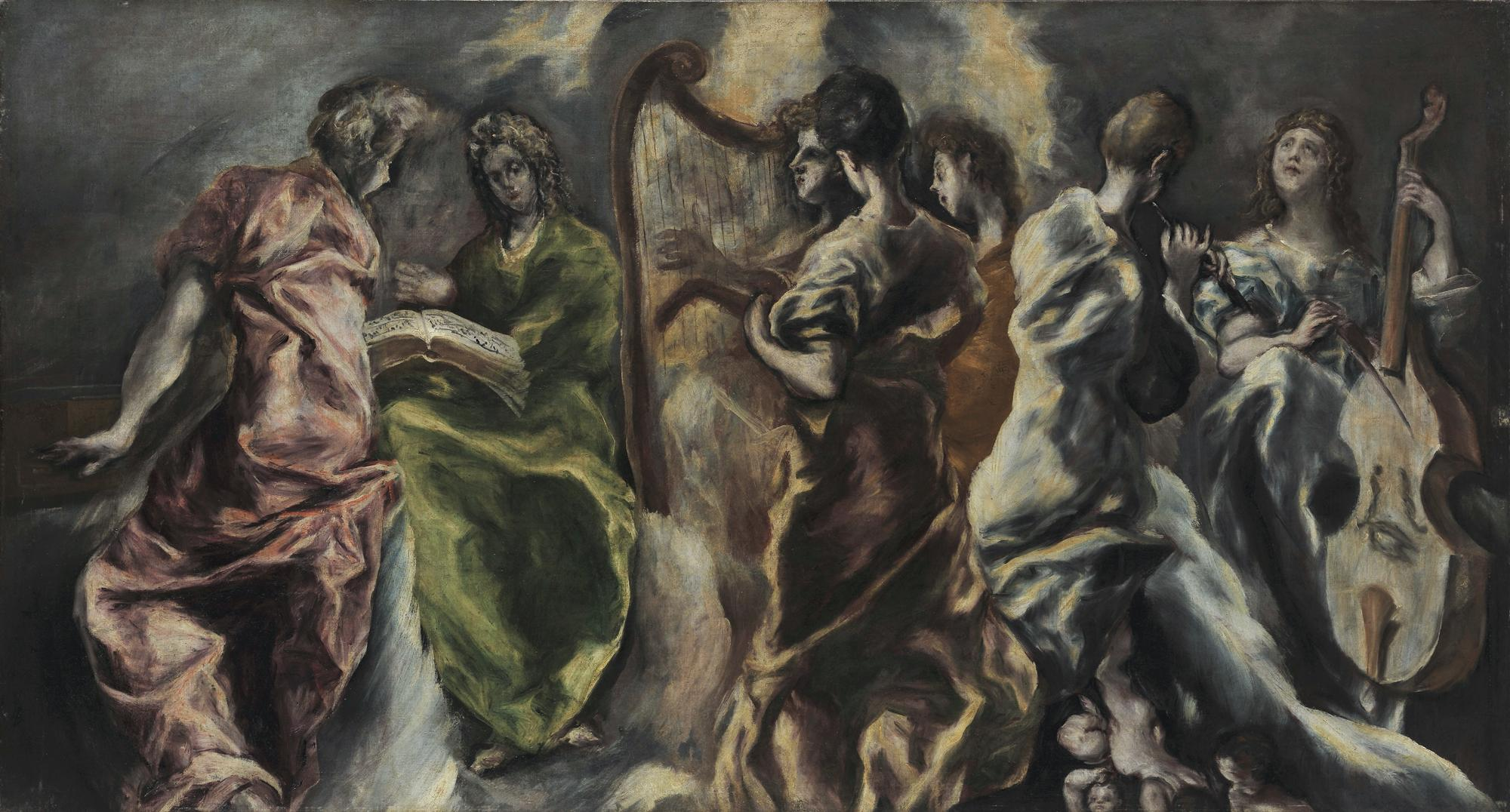
- Artist: El Greco
- Year: c. 1608–1614
- Medium: Oil on canvas
- Dimensions: 115 cm × 217 cm (45 in × 85 in)
- Location: National Gallery of Greece, Athens

Concert of Angels is a work of El Greco in oil on canvas from 1608, during his last period in Toledo, Spain. It is exhibited at the National Gallery in Athens.

Created at the end of his life, art historians have disputed whether this painting is a finished work or part of a working study for a commission of the Annunciation for the chapel of the Hospital de Tavera. It is not an independent composition but a cut-down fragment of the whole. It shows a celestial choir of angels, some of them with their backs to the viewer. Designed to hang high above the head of the viewer, the very extended heads and the anatomy of the characters show the influence of Michelangelo, though there are probably retouchings by Jorge Manuel Theotocópuli, the son of the painter. It once formed part of a threesome of paintings for the chapel. It is unknown when the paintings were removed from the chapel. It is also unknown when this painting was cut down, but Tiziana Frati assumes it was done in the latter half of the 19th century. Stylistically it is similar to the concert of angels seen at the top of El Greco's annunciation in the Prado.

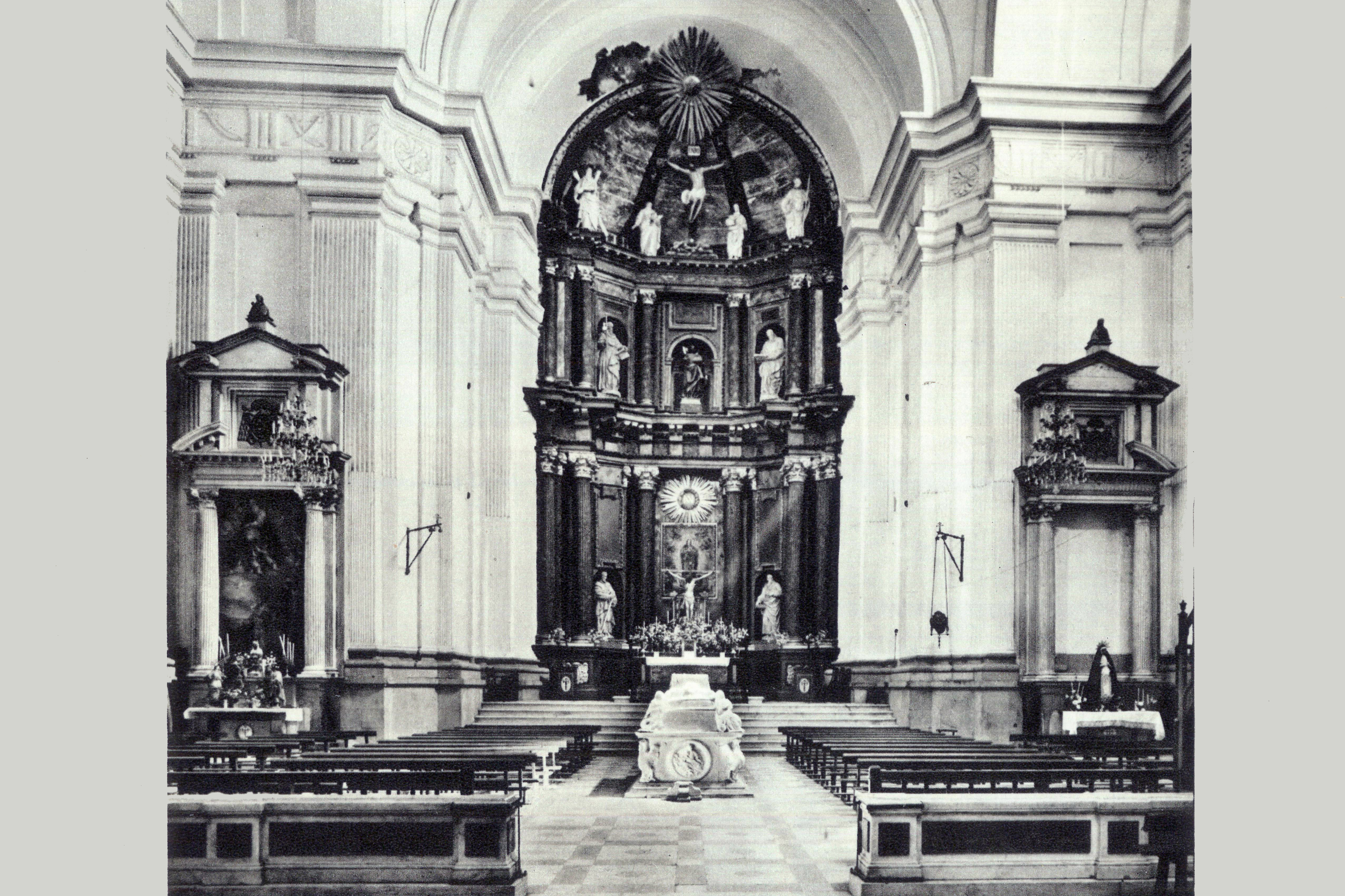
Old photo of chapel interior

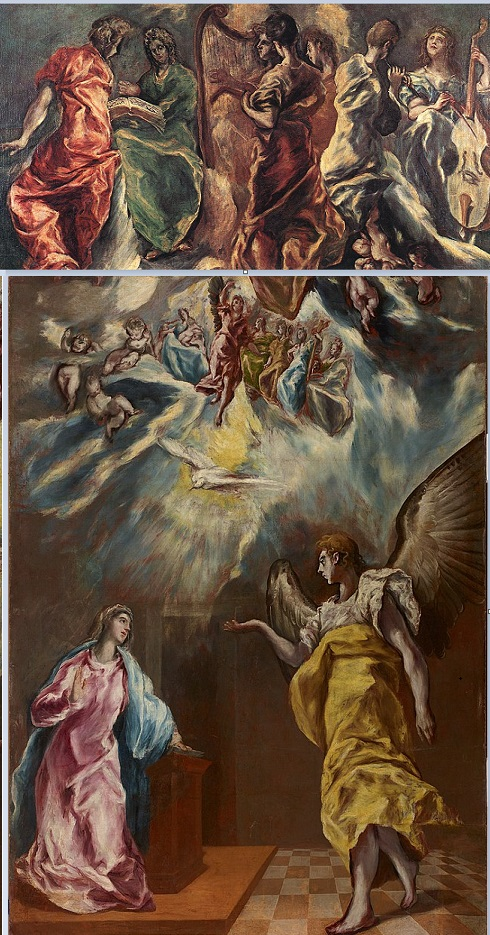
Annunciation reconstruction with Madrid fragment

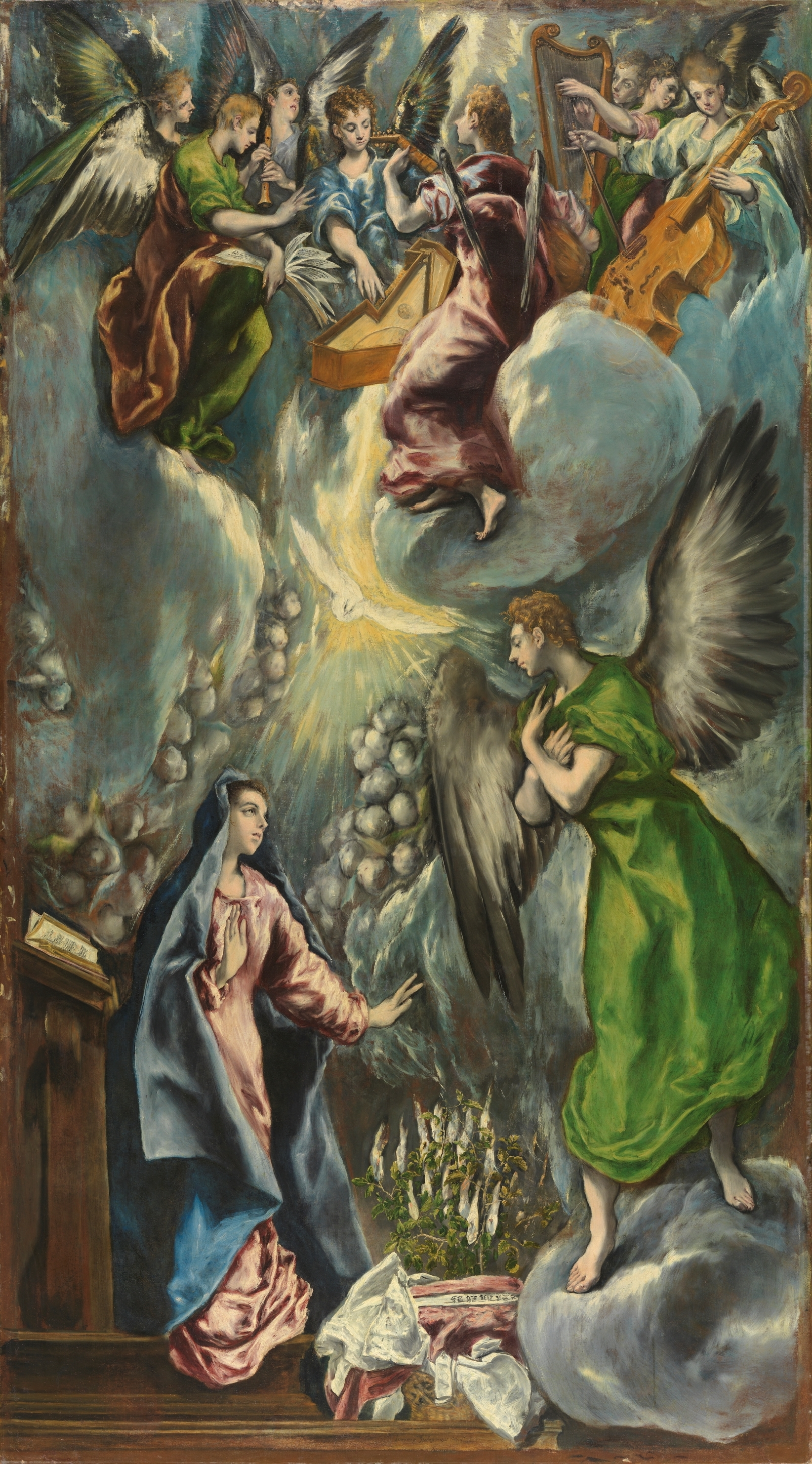
Prado version of the Annunciation

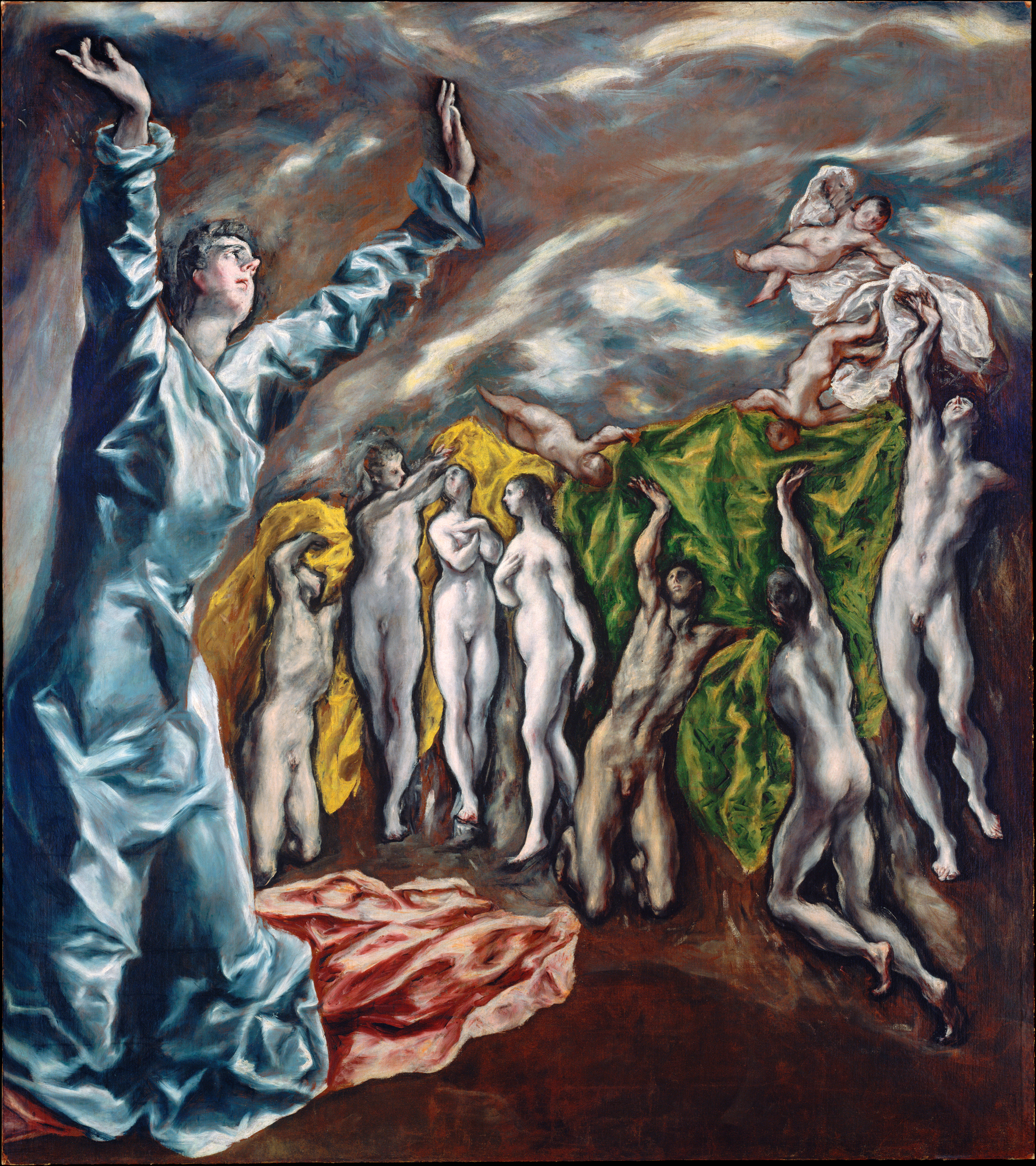
Vision of St John (also cut down, upper portion unknown)

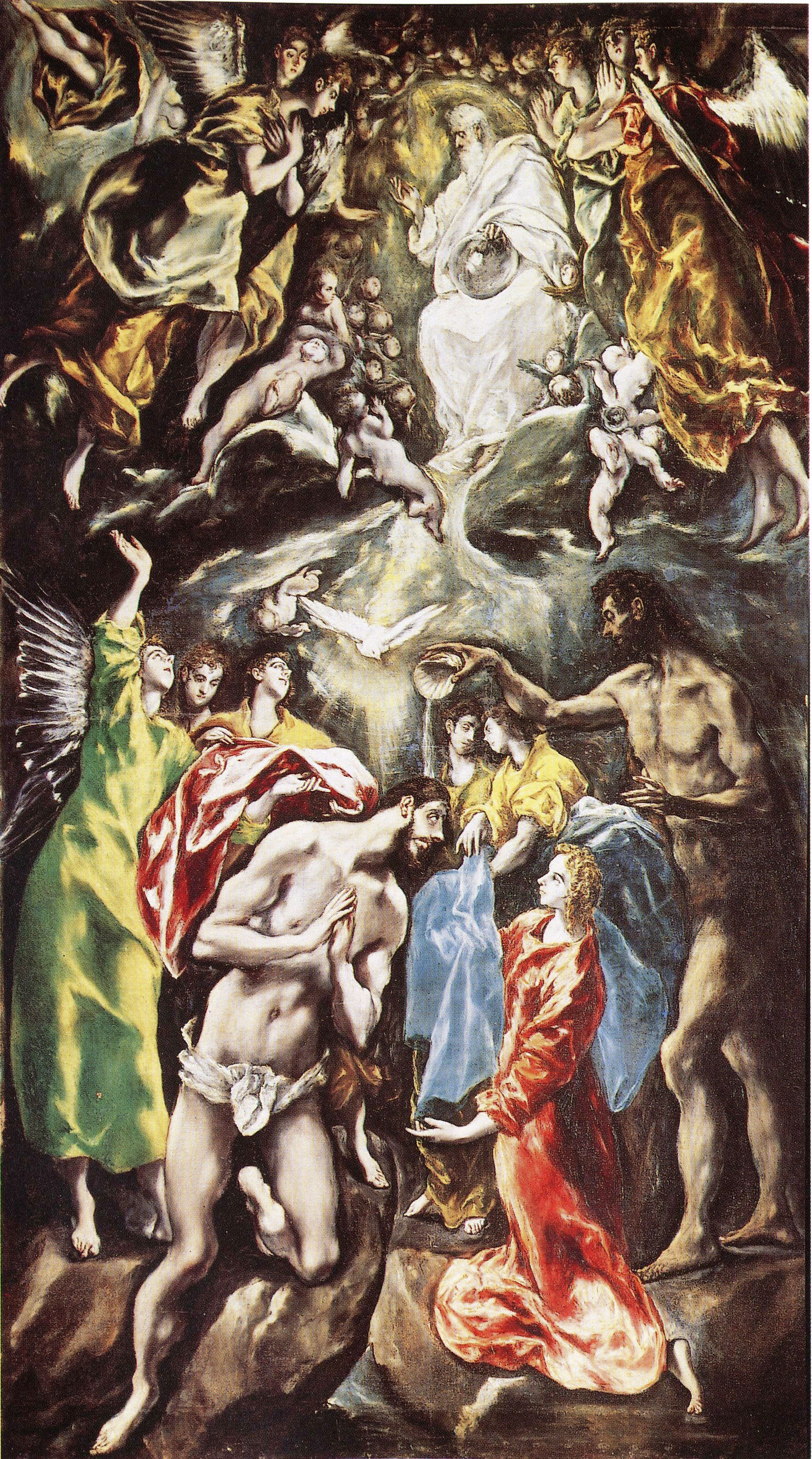
Baptism of Christ (still in Toledo)

== See also ==
- List of works by El Greco

== Bibliography ==
- Álvarez Lopera, José. El Greco. Madrid: Arlanza, 2005. ISBN 84-9550-344-1.
- Scholz-Hänsel, Michael. El Greco. Colonia: Taschen, 2003. ISBN 978-3-8228-3173-1.
