= Vergara =

Vergara may refer to:

== Law ==
- Vergara v. California, California court case regarding education
- Convention of Vergara, a 19th-century treaty ending the First Carlist War in Spain

== Places ==
- Vergara, Spanish-language name of Bergara, Gipuzkoa Province, Basque Country
- Vergara, Uruguay
- Vergara, Cundinamarca, Colombia
- Los Vergara, Jalisco, Mexico
- Vergara River, Chile
- Augusto Vergara Airport, an airport serving the city of Los Santos, Panama
- Quinta Vergara, a park in Viña del Mar, Chile
  - Quinta Vergara Amphitheater, an open-air theatre within Quinta Vergara

== Surname ==
Vergara is a Basque surname that has its origins in Gipuzkoa. Notable people with the surname include:

- Antonio Vergara (born 2003), Italian footballer
- Antonio de Vergara Azcarate (born 1612–1690) Spanish colonial governor of Cartagena de Indias.
- Aurora Vergara (born 1987) Colombian sociologist and academic.
- Adán Vergara (born 1981), Chilean footballer
- Al Vergara (born 1979), Filipino basketball player
- Alina Vergara (born 1966), Argentine field hockey player
- Andrea Tessa Vergara (born 1961), Chilean singer-songwriter
- Arnao de Vergara (ca.1490–ca.1557), Spanish master glassmaker
- Benito Vergara (1934–2015), Filipino plant scientist
- Bernardo Vergara (born 1937), Filipino civil engineer and politician
- Bernardo Vergara (cartoonist) (born 1966), Spanish comic artist and writer
- Camilo José Vergara (born 1944), Chilean-American writer and photographer
- Carlo Vergara (born 1971), Filipino graphic designer and illustrator
- Carmen Gisela Vergara, Panamanian lawyer and politician
- César Vergara (born 1982), Chilean football (soccer) player
- Cristóbal Vergara (born 1994), Chilean football (soccer) player
- Colet Vergara (born 2001), Filipino singer, rapper and dancer
- Duván Vergara (born 1996), Colombian football (soccer) player
- Fernando Vergara (born 1970), Chilean football (soccer) player and manager
- Francisco de Vergara (died 1545), Spanish Hellenist and humanist, brother of Juan de Vergara
- Francisco Javier Vergara y Velasco (1860–1914), Colombian geographer, cartographer and historian
- Francisco Ortiz de Vergara (1524–1574), Spanish conquistador and colonizer
- Gabriela Vergara (born 1974), Venezuelan actress and model
- George Vergara (1901–1982), American NFL football player and politician
- Gladys Vergara (1928–2016), Uruguayan astronomer
- Héctor Vergara (born 1966), Canadian soccer referee
- Ignacio Vergara (1715–1776), Spanish Baroque sculptor
- Ivette Vergara (born 1972), Chilean journalist and presenter
- Jay Vergara (born 1960), Filipino politician
- Jherson Vergara (born 1994), Colombian football (soccer) player
- Joane Vergara (born 1990), Puerto Rican handball player
- John Paul Vergara, Filipino scientist and professor
- Jorge Vergara (1955–2019), Mexican businessman
- José Vergara (boxer) (born 1915), Chilean boxer
- José Ignacio Flores de Vergara y Ximénez de Cárdenas (1733–1786), known as the "Pacificator of Peru"
- Estanislao Vergara y Sanz de Santamaría (1790–1855), Colombian president and politician.
- Felipe de Vergara y Caycedo (1745–1818) Colombian lawyer, writer and president of Colombia.
- José María Vergara y Vergara (1831–1872), Colombian diplomat, politician, journalist and writer
- Eladio Vergara y Vergara (1821–1888) Colombian writer.
- Juan de Vergara (1492–1557), Spanish humanist, brother of Francisco de Vergara
- Juan José Gurruchaga Vergara (born 1982), Chilean actor and TV presenter
- Juan Pablo Vergara (1985–2019), Peruvian football (soccer) player
- Lalaine Vergara-Paras (born 1987), American television actress
- Laura Vergara (born 1986), Spanish politician
- Luis de Ayala y Vergara (born 1768–1839) Colombian lawyer and President of New Granada.
- Jose de Ayala y Vergara (born 1761–1816) Colombian lawyer, military, Martyr of the Colombian independence.
- Luis Enrique Vergara (1922–1970), Mexican filmmaker
- Mario Vergara (1910–1950), Italian Roman Catholic priest and beatified martyr
- Marta Vergara (1898–1995), Chilean author, journalist and women's rights activist
- Mónica Vergara (born 1983), Mexican football (soccer) player
- Mylo Hubert Vergara (born 1962), Filipino Catholic bishop
- Nicolás de Vergara el Mozo (1540–1606), Spanish architect, sculptor and glassmaker
- Nisim Vergara (born 1998), Argentine football (soccer) player
- Omar Vergara (1943–2018), Argentine Olympic fencer
- Pablo Vergara (born 1988), Argentine football (soccer) player
- Pablo Vergara (sport shooter) (born 1954), Chilean sports shooter
- Patri Vergara, Spanish veterinarian and professor
- Pedro Nolasco Cruz Vergara (1857–1939), Chilean literary critic, novelist, writer and politician
- Pilar Vergara (born 1947), Chilean journalist
- Rosanna Vergara (born 1963), Filipino businesswoman and politician
- Rubi Vergara, killed in the Abundant Life Christian School shooting
- Sandra Vergara (born 1988), Colombian model and actress
- Sergio Vergara (disambiguation), several people with the name
- Sofía Vergara (born 1972), Colombian supermodel and actress
- Unai Vergara (born 1977), Spanish football (soccer) player
- Valentín Vergara (1879–1930), Argentine national deputy and governor of the province of Buenos Aires

== See also ==
- Bergara (disambiguation)
