= Opening of the Fifth Seal =

Unfinished painting by El Greco

The Opening of the Fifth Seal
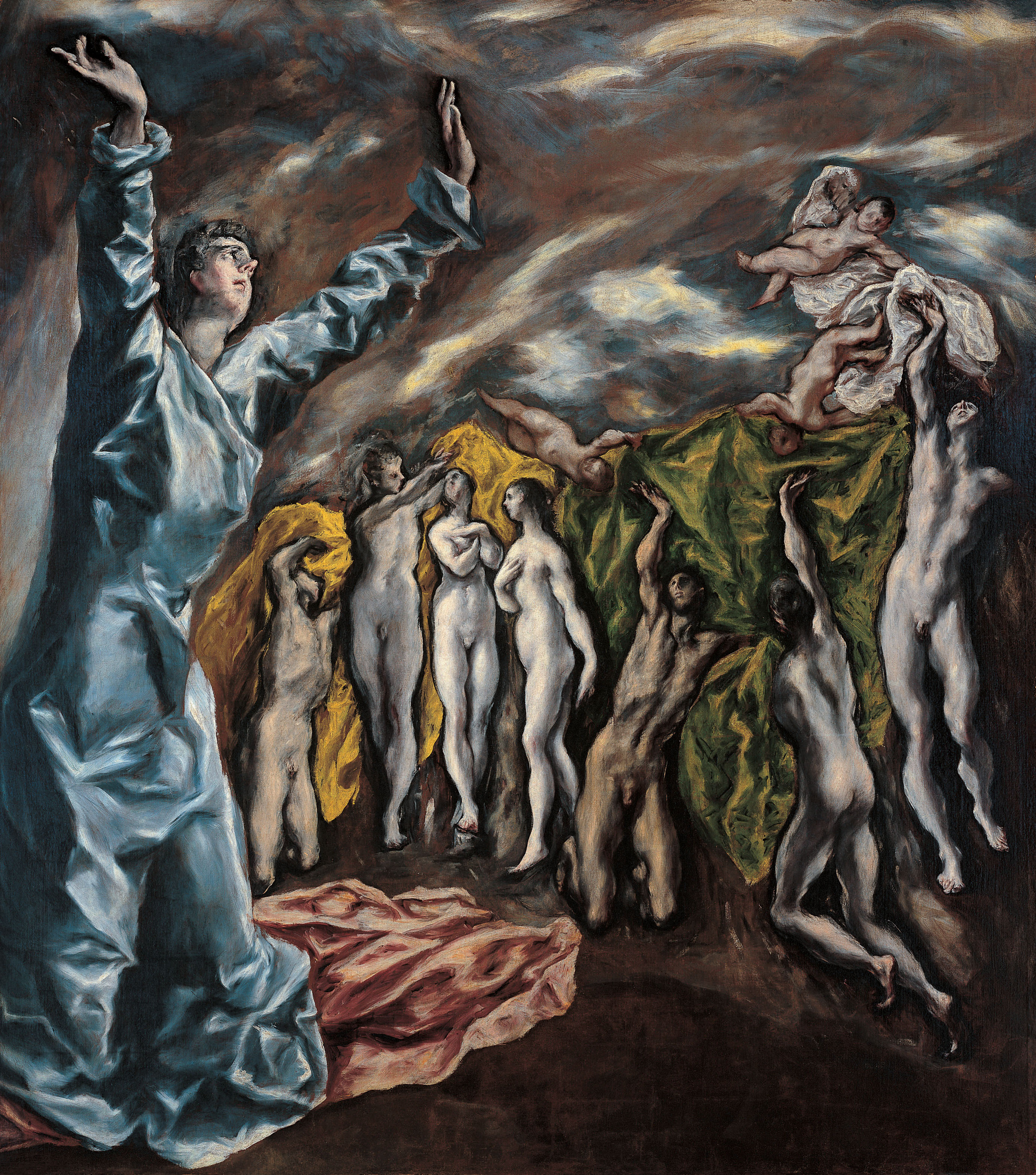
- Artist: El Greco
- Year: 1608–1614
- Medium: oil on canvas
- Dimensions: 224.8 cm × 199.4 cm (88.5 in × 78.5 in)
- Location: The Metropolitan Museum of Art, New York City

The Opening of the Fifth Seal (or The Fifth Seal of the Apocalypse or The Vision of Saint John) was painted in the last years of El Greco's life for a side-altar of the church of Saint John the Baptist outside the walls of Toledo. Before 1908, El Greco's painting had been referred to as Profane Love. The scholar Manuel B. Cossio had doubts about the title and suggested the Opening of the Fifth Seal. The Metropolitan Museum, where the painting is kept, comments: "the picture is unfinished and much damaged and abraded."

== Subject of the painting ==
The painting's subject is taken from the Book of Revelation 6:9–11, where the souls of martyrs cry out to God for justice upon their persecutors on Earth. The ecstatic figure of St. John dominates the canvas, while behind him naked souls writhe in a chaotic storm of emotion as they receive white robes of salvation.

The upper portion of the painting was destroyed in 1880. It is believed that the lost portion may have depicted the sacrificial lamb opening the Fifth Seal. The lost upper painting may have also resembled another piece by El Greco, Concert of Angels. Many believe that the surviving portion depicts profane love, while the missing upper portion depicts divine love.

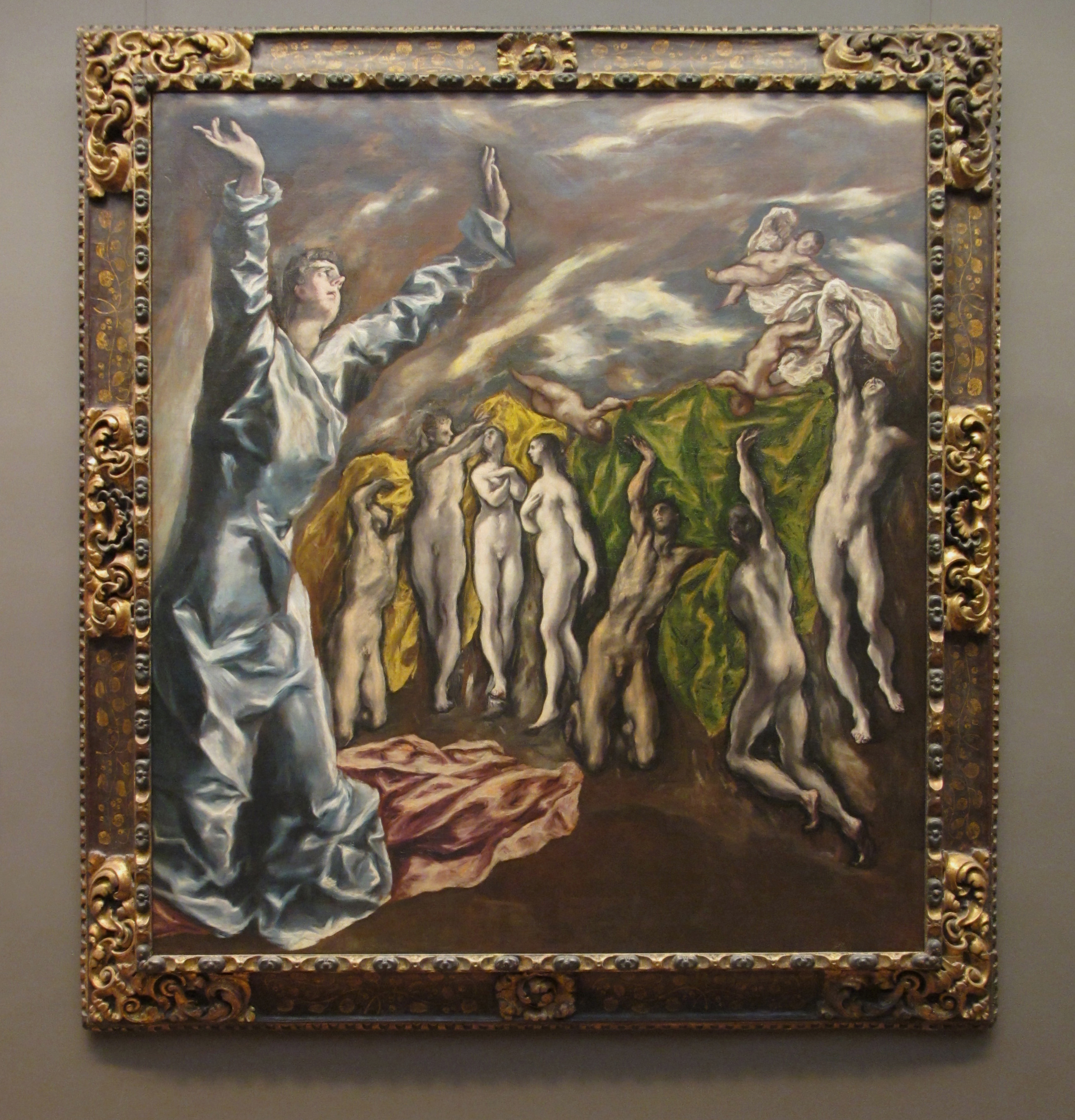

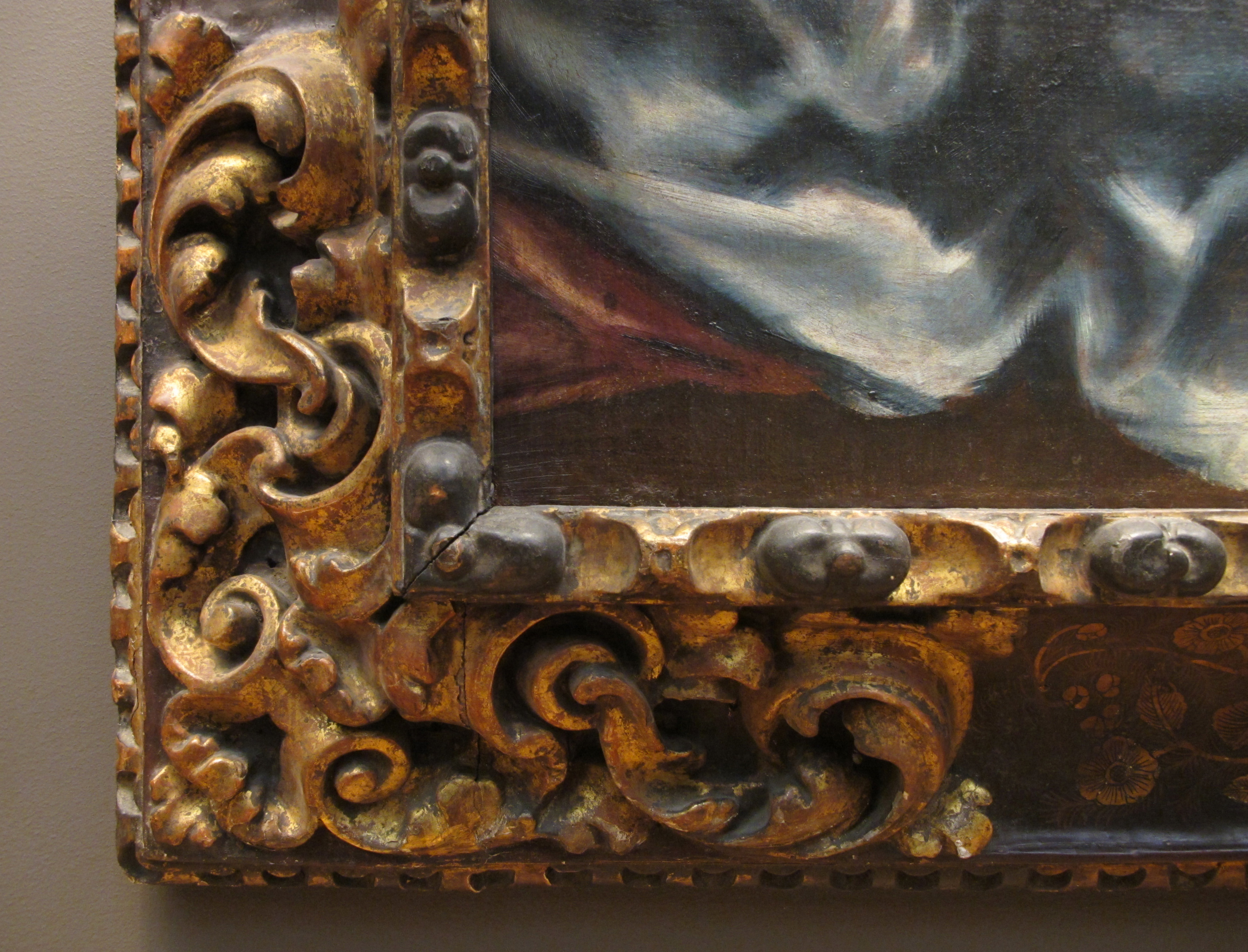

== Ownership ==
Upon El Greco's death in 1614, the work passed to his son, Jorge Manuel Theotocópuli. During the 19th century, it was owned by Antonio Cánovas del Castillo, Prime Minister of Spain. Dissatisfied with the condition of the piece, he attempted to have it restored in 1880. The attempted restoration removed at least 175 centimetres (69 inches) from the top of the canvas, leaving John the Evangelist emphatically pointing nowhere.

After Cánovas' death in 1897, the painting was sold for 1,000 pesetas (US$200) to Ignacio Zuloaga, a painter who was instrumental in reviving European interest in El Greco. The painting may be seen in the background of his work Mis amigos, representing several notable members of the Generation of '98. Zuloaga is known to have shown the painting to Pablo Picasso and Rainer Maria Rilke. He declared it as possessing a "visionary power" that made it a "precursor of modernism". In 1956, the Zuloaga Museum sold this artwork to the Metropolitan Museum of Art in New York City, where it is on exhibit today.

== Comparison with Les Demoiselles d'Avignon ==
Picasso's Les Demoiselles d'Avignon (1907, oil on canvas, 243.9 cm × 233.7 cm (96.0 in × 92.0 in), New York City, Museum of Modern Art)

It has been suggested that the Opening of the Fifth Seal served as an inspiration for the early Cubist works of Pablo Picasso, especially Les Demoiselles d'Avignon, which mirrors the expressionistic angularity of the painting. When Picasso was working on Les Demoiselles d'Avignon, he visited his friend Zuloaga in his studio in Paris and studied El Greco's Opening of the Fifth Seal. The relation between Les Demoiselles d'Avignon and the Opening of the Fifth Seal was pinpointed in the early 1980s, when the stylistic similarities and the relationship between the motifs of both works were analysed. Art historian Ron Johnson was the first to focus on the relationship between the two paintings. According to John Richardson, a British art historian, Les Demoiselles d'Avignon "turns out to have a few more answers to give once we realize that the painting owes at least as much to El Greco as Cézanne".

Efi Foundoulaki insists on the "activity of the triangle Picasso-Cézanne-El Greco, which is established in Les Demoiselles d'Avignon". Foundoulaki analyzes the Opening of the Fifth Seal and states that the clothed figure in the left part of the painting and the naked figures to the right showed the contradiction between profane and divine love. According to Rolf Laesse, this may have been the original inspiration of Picasso who in a preliminary drawing of the Demoiselles depicted a medical student holding a skull or a book and entering a room where there is a sailor among nude women. Richardson, however, conjectures that Picasso knew the interpretation by Cossio concerning the Opening of the Fifth Seal and based his theory extensively on this conjecture.

Richardson and Foundoulaki emphasize on the morphological parallels between the Opening of the Fifth Seal and Les Demoiselles d'Avignon, and explore the Picasso–Cézanne–El Greco relationship. Foundoulaki asserts that there is a similarity of shape and that Picasso ingeniously repeated the game with the |V and the inverted triangles of El Greco, something he had already begun in The Villagers. According to Foundoulaki, "the dialogue Picasso inaugurated with El Greco in Les Demoiselles d'Avignon, by means of Cézanne, is carried on in Cubism". Richardson sees the Apocalypse in El Greco's Opening of the Fifth Seal as the catalyst which showed Picasso how to harness the spiritual energy of a great religious artist to his own demonic ends. According to Richardson, Picasso followed this apocalyptic vision his whole life.

== See also ==
- List of works by El Greco
