= Nicolás de Vergara el Mozo =

Spanish architect and sculptor

Nicolás de Vergara el Mozo (1540 - 11 December 1606) was a Spanish sculptor, architect, blacksmith and glassmaker. He worked in the Toledo Cathedral, where he was master of works, and in other religious and civil buildings. He was the son of the architect and sculptor Nicolás de Vergara el Viejo and Catalina de Colonia, and brother of Juan de Vergara. He was also the nephew of the master glassmakers Arnao de Vergara and Arnao de Flandes and grandson of Arnao of Flanders the Elder.

== Works in the cathedral of Toledo ==
Still in his father's life, the council of the Toledo Cathedral of Toledo named him his sculptor in the year 1573. Together with his father, he performed the two bronze lecterns of the choir of the Cathedral, and when his father died two years later, he worked with his brother Juan de Vergara, to finish the stained glass windows of the cathedral, works that ended in 1580 .

He was appointed twice as the master of the Cathedral, the second time in 1587, remaining in office until his death. He then began the works of the Chapel of the Tabernacle in Herrerian style and was responsible for the traces of the architectural complex of the Chapel of the Tabernacle, Reliquary, Sacristy and courtyard and house of the treasurer. He also made the window of the rosette of the door of the Lions and on the interior facade of the clock door the medallion of the Virgin of the Annunciation.

== Architecture ==
- Plans of the church of San Bartolomé de Toledo.
- Cloister of the convent of San Clemente de Toledo.
- Hospital Tavera de Toledo, together with the architects Alonso de Covarrubias and Monegro.
- Toledo City Council, with Juan de Herrera, Juan Bautista Monegro and Jorge Manuel Theotocópuli .
- Augustinian Convent of Outside the Walls of Madrigal de las Altas Torres, Ávila.
- 1568. Convent of San José de Malagón, Ciudad Real
- 1575. Plans and stonework of the monastery of Santo Domingo el Antiguo de Toledo.
- Plans of the chapel of San José de Toledo in 1588 .
- 1590. Church of San Martín de Pusa, Toledo.
- 1595. Design of the tabernacle of the Royal Monastery of Santa María de Guadalupe in Cáceres.

== Other works ==
- By 1573, at the request of Philip II of Spain, he made the corners of the choir books of the Monastery of El Escorial in bronze .
- 1574-1580. Grate of the grave of Cardinal Cisneros in Alcalá de Henares, which his father left initiated.
- 1590. Silver urn for the body of Santa Leocadia de Toledo, on whose trace was made by silversmith Francisco Merino .

On these dates he made with the teachers Juan Bautista Vázquez el Viejo and Juan Correa de Vivar (painting) the main altarpiece for the church of Santa María Magdalena de Mondejar (Guadalajara) designed by Alonso de Covarruvias. This great and great work today does not exist since it was destroyed in the Spanish Civil War, being able to admire in the same location, an exact copy of the pictorial and sculptural set in all its original magnitude and quality.

== Bibliography ==
- Ceán Bermúdez, Juan Agustín (1800). Historical dictionary of the most illustrious professors of the Fine Arts in Spain. Madrid: Printing of the Widow of Ibarra.
