= Bergara (surname) =

Bergara is a Spanish surname. Notable people with the surname include:

- Ane Bergara (born 1987), Spanish footballer
- Danny Bergara (1942–2007), Uruguayan footballer
- Carlos Bergara (1895–1971), Argentine weightlifter
- Federico Bergara (born 1971), Uruguayan footballer
- Gaizka Bergara (born 1986), Spanish footballer
- Ignacio Bergara (1940–2004), Spanish footballer
- Iñaki Bergara (born 1962), Spanish footballer
- Markel Bergara (born 1986), Spanish footballer
- Mario Bergara (politician) (born 1985), Uruguayan economist
- Mario Bergara (footballer) (1937–2001), Uruguayan footballer
- Ryan Bergara (born 1990), American Internet personality

== See also ==
- Bergara, a town in Basque Country, Spain
- Vergara (disambiguation)
