= Sergio Vergara =

Sergio Vergara is the name of:

- Sergio Vergara (fencer) (1927–2003), Chilean Olympic fencer
- Sergio Vergara (politician) (born 1973), Venezuelan politician
- Sergio Vergara (Paraguayan footballer) (born 1988), Paraguayan international footballer
- Sergio Vergara (Chilean footballer) (born 1994), Chilean footballer

== See also ==
- Vergara (surname)
