= Portrait of Jorge Manuel Theotocópuli =

Oil painting portrait by El Greco of his son

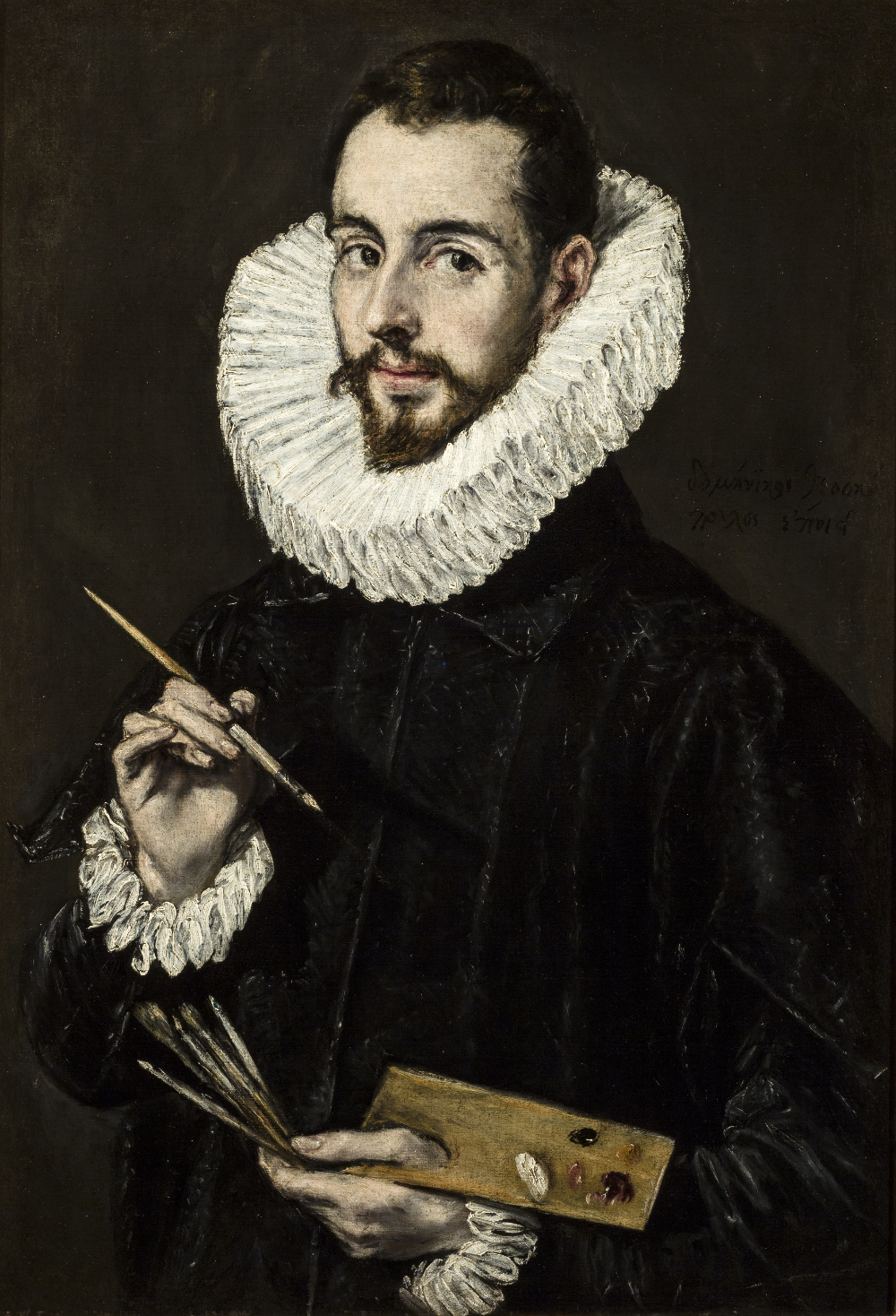
- Artist: El Greco
- Year: 1597-1603
- Dimensions: 81 cm × 56 cm (32 in × 22 in)
- Location: Museo de Bellas Artes, Seville

Portrait of Jorge Manuel Theotocópuli is a c. 1597–1603 painting by El Greco, painted during his time in Toledo. It depicts his son and collaborator Jorge Manuel Theotocópuli. It is now in the Museum of Fine Arts of Seville in Seville.

== Description ==
Jorge Manuel Theotocópuli collaborated with his father, El Greco, on many works. In this portrait, he is shown wearing black clothes and a white ruff, in front of a dark background. He holds brushes and a palette in his hands. The pictorial style is consistent with other Venetian painting.

== See also ==
- List of works by El Greco
