= Arnao de Vergara =

Spanish stained glass artist (c. 1490–1550)

- Born: c. 1490
- Died: 1550 (aged 59–60)
- Occupation: Stained glass artist (glassmaker)
- Known for: Stained glass works for Seville Cathedral and Alhambra
- Father: Arnao de Flandes

Arnao de Vergara (c. 1490-1550) was a 16th-century Spanish stained glass artist. Between 1525 and 1536, he created several windows for Seville Cathedral. He later moved to Granada, where he produced additional works.

== Biography ==
His father was the stained glass artist Arnao de Flandes the Elder. He may have originally come from Flanders and settled in Burgos, though it is also possible that he came from Cologne, Germany. He maintained a workshop in Burgos but also worked on projects in Ávila and Palencia. He married Inés de Vergara. His brother, Nicolás de Vergara the Elder, was also a glassmaker, and his son, Nicolás de Vergara the Younger, followed in his footsteps, with the latter establishing himself in Toledo.

Arnao de Vergara learned the craft of stained glass and the style of Flemish windows around 1500 in his father's workshop. Around 1525, he moved to the Santa María Magdalena district in Seville and, in September of that year, offered his services to the cathedral chapter, as no stained glass had been installed since Juan Jacques' death in 1520. The chapter commissioned him to complete the stained glass windows for the cathedral's dome, which he finished in April 1526. He lived comfortably from his work and, in 1531, hired a Neapolitan servant named Antonio Soldán.

A few years later, his brother Arnao de Flandes also moved from Burgos to Seville, and from 1534, they collaborated on several commissions.

Vergara was not only a stained glass artist. In 1532, he signed a one-year contract with Granadan miniaturist Andrés Ramírez to collaborate on miniatures for the Monastery of Santa María de las Cuevas and other locations.

He employed Wyllen van der Score as a journeyman in his Seville workshop from March to October 1535. At an unknown date, he took on Desiderio Tahelon as an apprentice, whom he dismissed in 1537. In 1538, he hired Alonso de Narváez as an apprentice.

In 1536, Vergara submitted a grievance to the cathedral chapter, claiming he was not receiving the agreed-upon materials for his work and was entitled to a daily gold ducat if work was halted due to this issue. For four months, the cathedral had provided neither materials nor payment. The chapter responded that Vergara had not fulfilled his obligations or provided required samples. This dispute was the main reason Vergara left for Granada, though his brother Arnao de Flandes continued working on cathedral windows. By 1537, Vergara was in Granada and granted his brother legal authority to collect payments owed by the cathedral chapter. By 1540, he was recorded as a resident of Granada. That year, he traveled to Seville to pay Jerónimo de Herreras for nine crates of stained glass and to terminate his collaboration with his brother.

In Granada, he created many works, most of which have unfortunately been lost. Between 1538 and 1539, he worked on stained glass for various rooms in the Royal House of the Alhambra. Later, he produced windows for the Convent of San Jerónimo and the Church of Santa Ana in Granada.

== Works ==
He created the following works:

- 1525–1526. The Presentation of the Virgin in the Temple. Dome of Seville Cathedral.
- 1525–1526. The Visitation. Dome of Seville Cathedral.
- 1526. The Finding of Jesus. Dome of Seville Cathedral.
- 1526. Jesus Among the Doctors. Dome of Seville Cathedral. Due to various renovations, only small fragments of Vergara's original window remain.
- 1526. The Meeting of Jesus. Dome of Seville Cathedral.
- 1532. Coat of Arms of the Count of Ureña and His Wife. Church of Santa María, Osuna. Lost.
- 1534. Isaiah, Jeremiah, Ezekiel, and Daniel. Window on the epistle side, near the transept, in the central nave of Seville Cathedral. Lost.
- 1534–1535. Tobias, Zechariah, Balaam, and Jonah. Window on the gospel side, near the transept, in the central nave of Seville Cathedral. Lost.
- 1534. The Virgin of Mercy Sheltering the Maidens with Her Mantle. Chapel of the Maidens, Seville Cathedral.
- 1535. Saint Sebastian. Window above the Palos Door, Seville Cathedral.
- c. 1535. Jesus Carrying the Cross. Epistle side, behind the high altar. Revised in 1552 by Arnao de Flandes, incorporating parts of a window made by Vergara around 1535.
- 1536–1537. The Assumption of the Virgin. Southern gable of the transept, Seville Cathedral.
- 1536–1537. Saint Hermenegild. Western arm of the gospel side transept, Seville Cathedral.
- 1536–1537. Decorative Motif Strip. Fragments reused from a window by Arnao de Vergara.
- 1536–1537. Stained glass for the Monastery of the Cartuja, Jerez de la Frontera.
- 1538–1539. Stained glass for the baths and other new rooms, Alhambra. Lost.
- 1544–1550. Unpainted white stained glass. Granada Cathedral.
- 1544–1550. The Adoration of the Magi. Created for the Convent of San Jerónimo, Granada. Now in the Museum of Santa Cruz, Toledo.
- 1547–1549. Stained glass for the churches of Montejícar, Alhendín, and Gójar.
- 1547. Stained glass for the Church of Santa Ana, Granada. Lost.

== Bibliography ==
- Alonso Abad, María Pilar (2016). Las Vidrieras de la Catedral de Burgos [The Stained Glass Windows of Burgos Cathedral]. Madrid: Instituto de Historia (CSIC). ISBN 978-84-608-8912-0.
- Nieto Alcaide, Víctor (1994) [1974]. Arnao de Vergara. Secretariado de Publicaciones de la Diputación de Sevilla. ISBN 84-7798-104-3.
