= Carmen Gisela Vergara =

Panamanian lawyer, diplomat and international trade expert

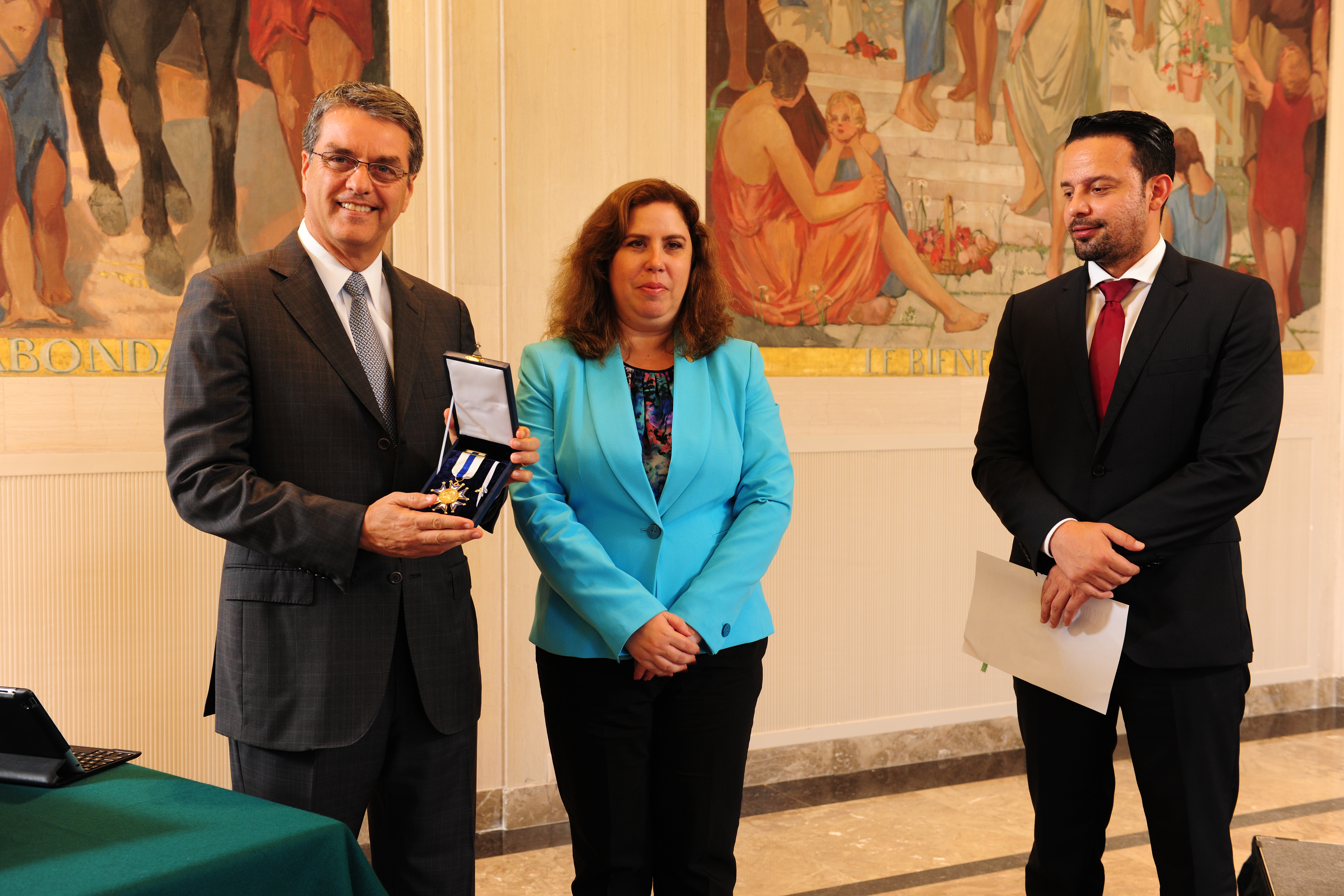
- Born: 26 September; Panama
- Occupation: Trade Diplomat
- Known for: Diplomat, trade

Carmen Gisela Vergara is a Panamanian lawyer, diplomat and international trade expert. She was appointed Secretary-General of the Secretariat for Central American Economic Integration (SIECA) from July 2013 to June 2017 by the Council of Ministers of Economic Integration of Central America. Carmen Gisela Vergara also served as Panama's Minister for Trade and Industry, and Member of the Board of Directors of the Central American Bank for Economic Integration (CABEI). She currently serves as Executive Director of PROPANAMA.

== Education and career ==
Vergara studied law and political science. She has a degree in banking and finance law from the Externado University of Colombia before completing post-graduate studies in international trade negotiations at the University of Santiago, Chile.

After completing her studies, she returned to Panama. She worked at a state bank, as an executor judge, before establishing Panama's investment promotion agency (PROPANAMA). Her career at the Ministry of Trade and Industry began first as the first national director for attracting investment and promoting exports. Vergara then established and managed the first business incubator at Panama's City of Knowledge. She returned to the Ministry of Trade and Industry as Deputy Minister for Foreign Trade overseeing exports, investments and trade negotiations. Vergara was appointed Minister on 1 April 2008, and during her tenure she was responsible for the negotiations for preferential trade agreements with Singapore, Canada, Colombia, Central America and the European Union while overseeing the development of key industries such as energy, mining, cinematographic industries, amongst others.

She was appointed by the Panamanian government as member of the Board of Directors at CABEI in 2009. Vergara was then appointed by the Central American Council of Ministers of Economic Integration, Secretary-General of SIECA on 1 July 2013, choosing to focus on issues such as economic and gender equality, creative industries and trade facilitation policies. During her tenure as Secretary-General, Guatemala and Honduras established the first and only customs union in the Americas.

Upon completion of her appointment at SIECA, Vergara became Executive Director of the Federation of Chambers and Industrial Associations of Central America and the Dominican Republic.

In July 2019, the Panamanian Ministry of Foreign Affairs appointed Vergara as Ambassador and Executive Director of PROPANAMA, the national investment and export promotion agency.
