= Baptism of Christ (El Greco, Toledo) =

Painting by El Greco

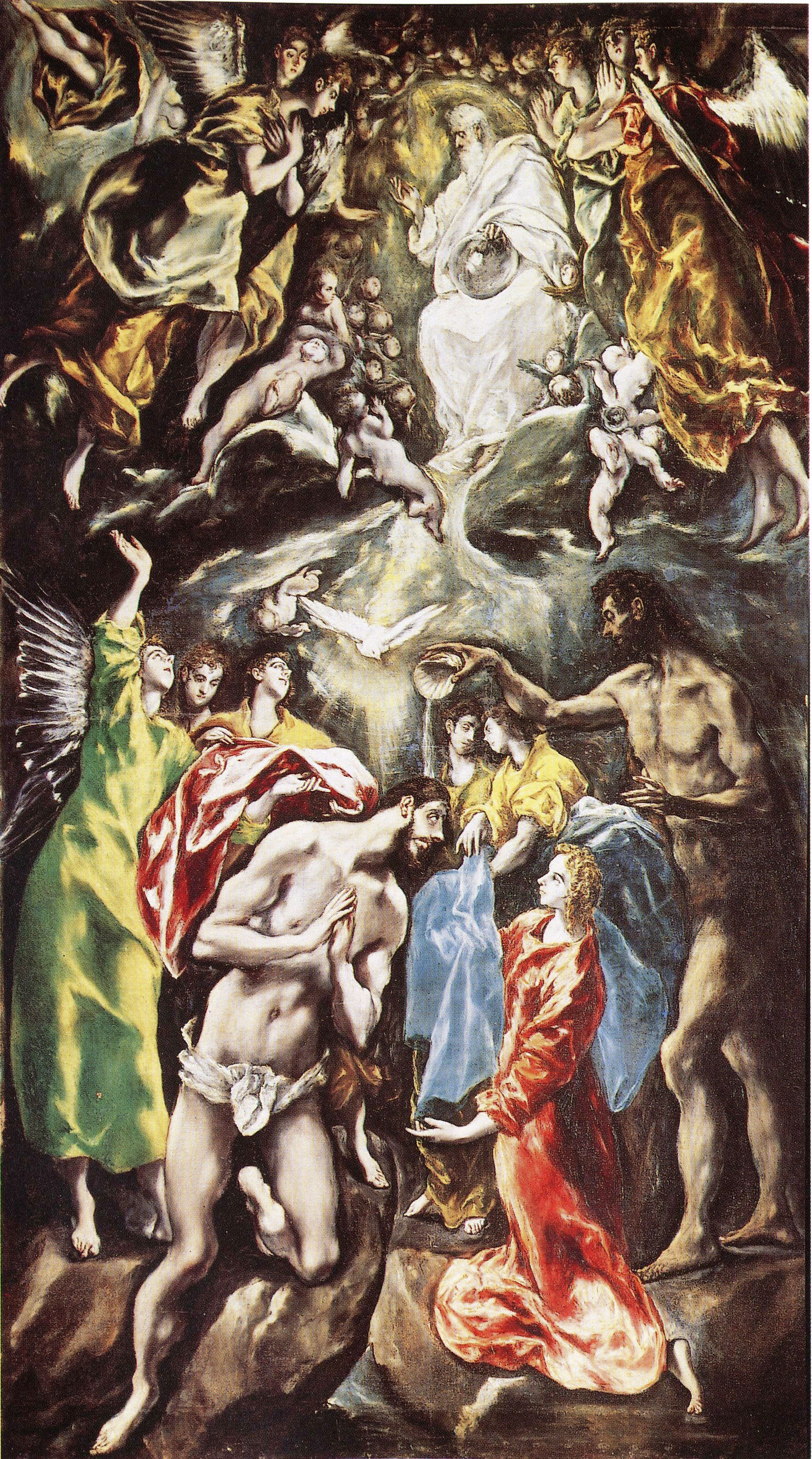
- Artist: El Greco
- Year: 1608-1614
- Medium: oil on canvas
- Dimensions: 330 cm × 221 cm (130 in × 87 in)
- Location: Hospital de Tavera, Toledo

Baptism of Christ is a 1608–1614 painting by El Greco, made towards the end of his life in Toledo and completed by his son Jorge Manuel Theotocópuli. It is now in the Hospital de Tavera in Toledo.

== Description ==
The work was produced almost entirely by Jorge Manuel Theotocópuli, El Greco's son. Jesus appears kneeling while Saint John the Baptist at right pours water onto his head from a conch. In the upper, God the Father and the dove of the Holy Spirit are painted to unite the figures of the Holy Trinity. The strong lighting recalls the work of Michelangelo.

This large canvas was delivered to the Tavera Hospital shortly before 1624, the date on which it was already included in the inventory of this institution. It is likely that it was designed to be placed in the main altarpiece, in the central niche of the lower floor, which has the appropriate measurements. However, the Tabernacle of the Tavera Hospital would have made it difficult to contemplate. It was then placed in the altarpiece on the right side. After a brief move, it was returned to the same altarpiece and a landscape was added at the bottom, in order to fill the space that was empty (circa 1670). There it remained until the Spanish Civil War. Later, all the paintings by El Greco in the Hospital were exhibited in the palace of the Duchess of Lerma (in the same Hospital). They then returned to their place, and this work is found once again in the altarpiece on the right side.
