= Arnao de Flandes =

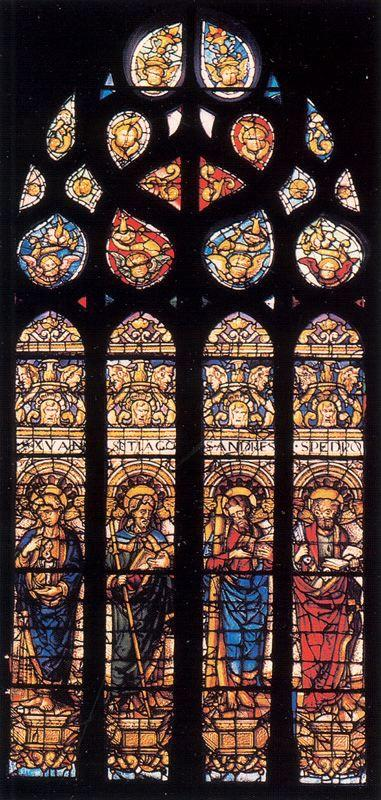
Window produced by Arnao de Flandes Hijo for Seville Cathedral, showing Saints John, James, Andrew and Peter

Arnao de Flandes (literally Arnao of Flanders) or Arnao de Flandes the Elder was a master glassmaker born in Flanders at an unknown date in the second half of the 15th century. He is believed to have moved to Spain between 1480 and 1490 and set up a workshop in Burgos, producing work for Avila Cathedral (1497), Palencia Cathedral (1503) and Burgos Cathedral (1511–1515).

== Family ==
His two sons were also glassmakers:

- Arnao de Flandes the Younger, is sometimes confused with his father and worked on Seville Cathedral between 1534 and 1557; the
- Arnao de Vergara, produced windows for Seville Cathedral (1525–1538), Astorga Cathedral (1525–1528) and the Monastery of Saint Jerome (1544–1550).
