= Hospital de Tavera =

Renaissance building in Toledo, Spain

Coordinates: 39°51′56.35″N 4°1′26.45″W

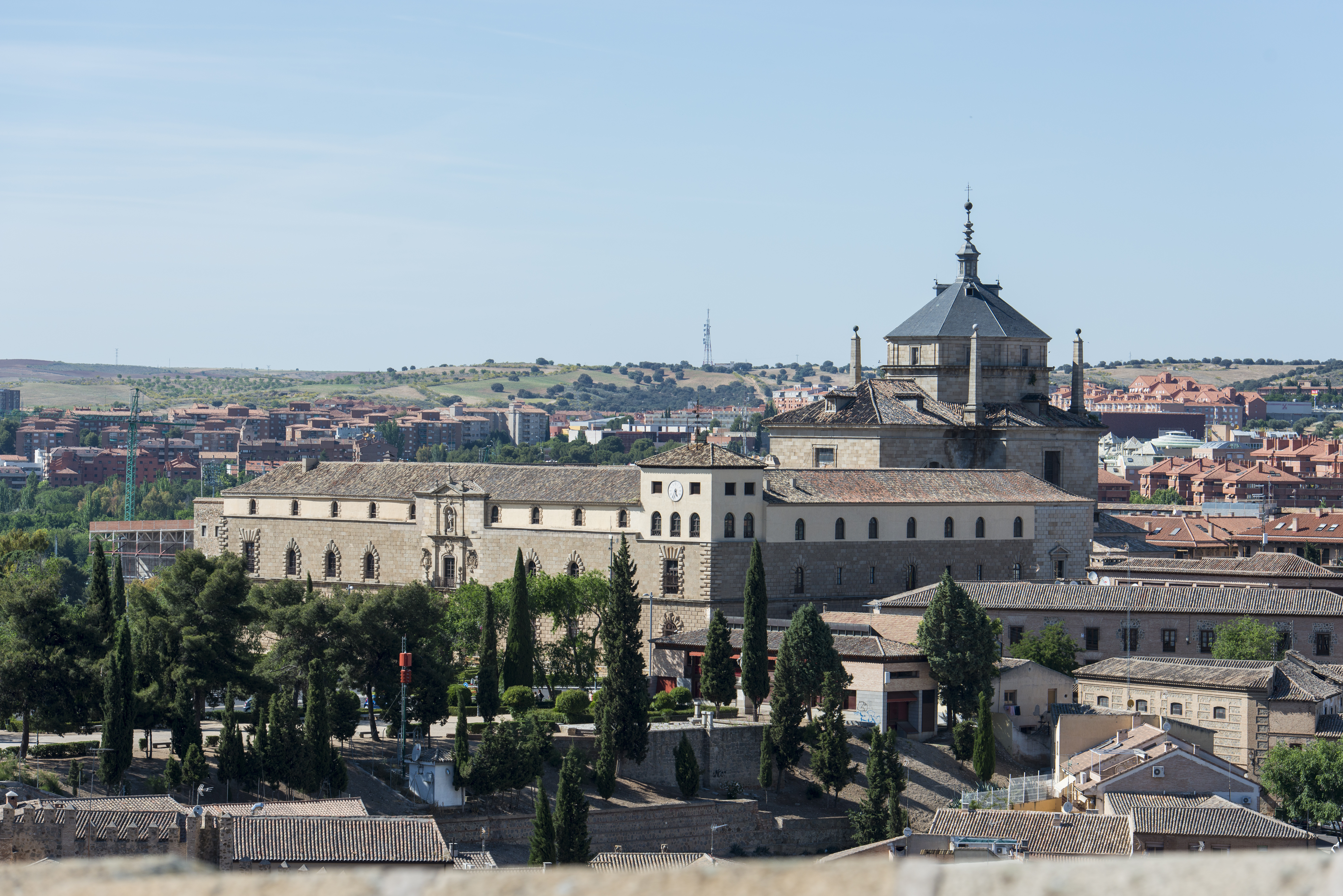
Facade of the Hospital de Tavera.

The Hospital de Tavera, also known as the Hospital de San Juan Bautista, Hospital de afuera, or simply as Hospital Tavera, is an important building of Renaissance architecture located in the Spanish city of Toledo. It was built between 1541 and 1603 by order of the Cardinal Tavera. This hospital is dedicated to John the Baptist and also served as pantheon for its patron, Cardinal Tavera. Initially it began to be constructed under the supervision of Alonso de Covarrubias, being succeeded by other architects, with Bartolomé Bustamante finishing the work.

The remoteness with the old part of the city made it known as el hospital de afuera (the hospital outside), since within the walls there already existed the Hospital de Santa Cruz.

Currently the building remains the property of the House of Medinaceli and inside it is the Museo Fundación Lerma, which houses part of the artistic collections of this lineage, as well as the Section of the Nobility of the National Historic Archive.

== The building ==
The set is composed by two columned courtyards, a church (where is the crypt of the Ducal House of Medinaceli) and the palace-museum, that includes part of the old hospital.

The appearance of the building is that of a Florentine Renaissance palace, except for the portal, that was constructed between the years 1760 and 1762. It is a regular building with an Italianate façade, with equidistant and rectangular windows on the lower floor and semicircular on the upper, being the opposite of the extreme. The ensemble is joined by two columned twinned courtyards, separated and joined together by a double arcade that crosses them towards the church.

The portal of the church is of Genoese marble. The interior presents a single nave and the crossing covered by a cupola with lantern, on pendentives and drum, like the basilica of the Monastery of El Escorial. Beneath it stands the tomb of Cardinal Tavera, a work made in white marble by Alonso Berruguete and accompanied by other funeral sculptures. The reredos of the church was designed by El Greco and carried out by his son Jorge Manuel. The goldwork of the tabernacle is the work of Julio Pascual.

== The museum ==
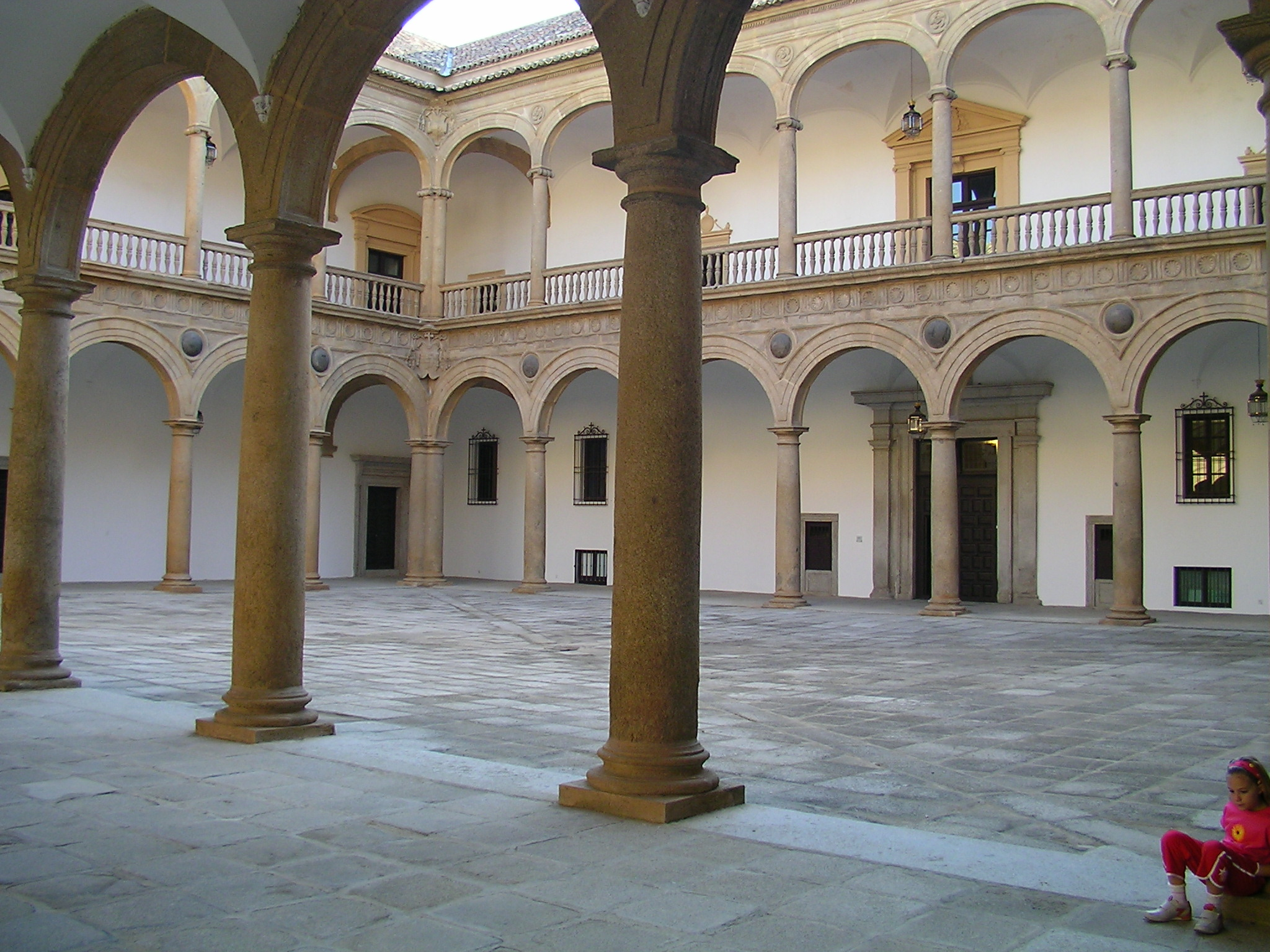
Arcade of the inner courtyard of the Hospital de Tavera.

In the museum there is a large archive of documents and numerous works of art of great value are preserved: paintings by El Greco, Ribera, Tintoretto, Luca Giordano, Titian, Snyders and Jacopo Bassano, among others. One of the few portraits painted by Zurbarán, and a copy of Tiziano's Equestrian Portrait of Charles V (Museo del Prado), painted by Sánchez Coello. Equally exceptional is the sculpture of the Resurrected Christ, by El Greco. In addition, it lodges in its dependencies the building of the old pharmacy of the hospital and the Section of the Nobility of the National Historic Archive.

== Other institutions that the building houses ==
The file: In 1988 the State signed an agreement with the Ducal House of Medinaceli, owner of the building, which ceded a part of it to house the Section of the Nobility of the National Historical Archive, which moved to Toledo and began to operate in 1993 in its new dependencies.

The school: In 1887 the Daughters of Charity arrived to the hospital to take care of the sick, attending the sacristy of the iglesia de San Juan Bautista and teaching poor children. Thus were born the schools of San Juan Bautista, an educational institution that still exists in the same building where it was founded in the 19th century, adapted to the current Education Law.

== Cinema scene ==
The Hospital of Tavera has been employed as a filming location for films from Viridiana (1961) and Tristana (1970) of Luis Buñuel, until La conjura de El Escorial (2008), happening through the superproduction The Three Musketeers (1973), of Richard Lester. Also several scenes of series of TVE were filmed, like Fortunata y Jacinta, shot in 1980 and based on the homonymous novel of Benito Perez Galdós, Águila Roja or Carlos, rey emperador.
