= Jorge Manuel Theotocópuli =

Spanish painter and architect

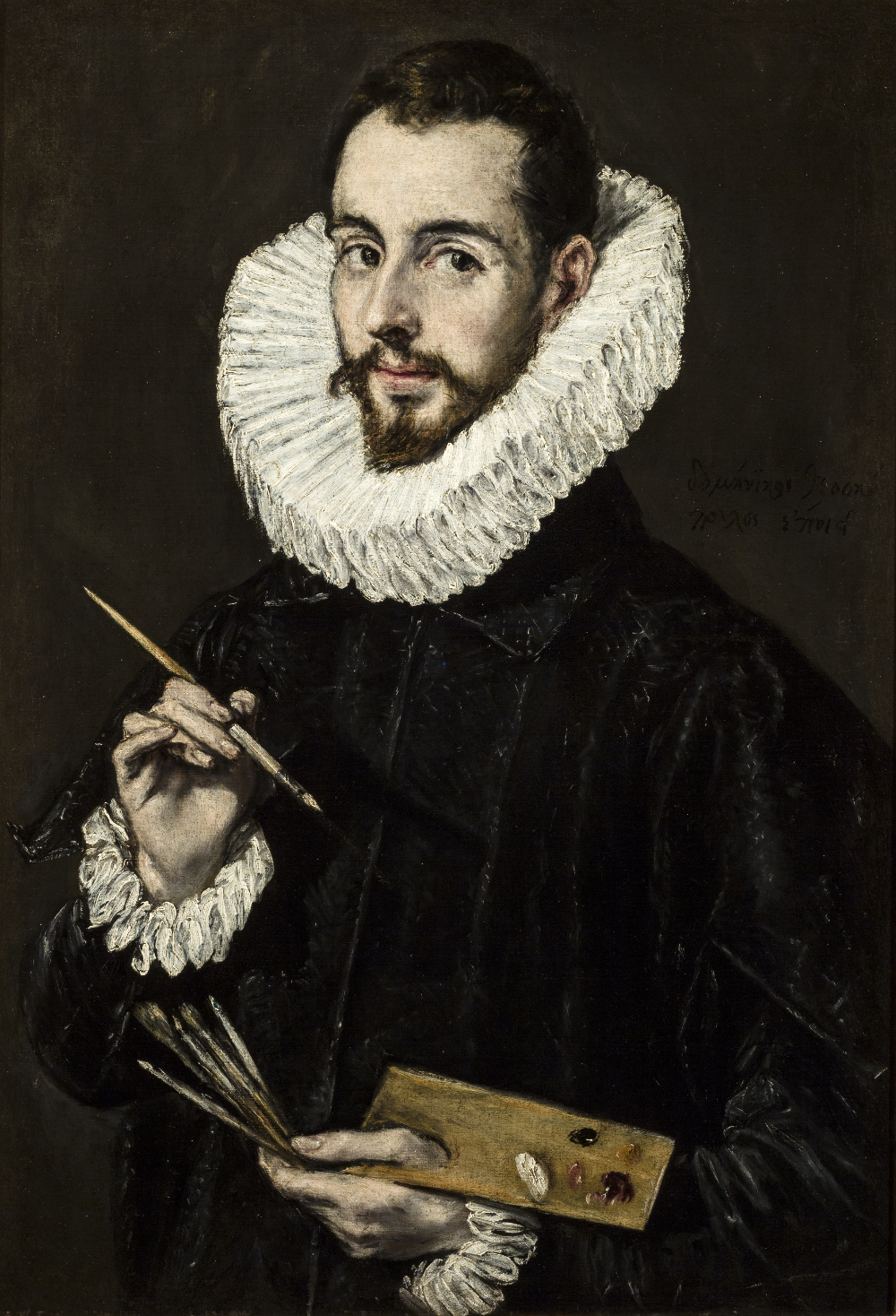
Jorge Manuel Theotocópuli; portrait by his father (c.1600)

Jorge Manuel Theotocópuli de las Cuevas (1578, Toledo - 29 March 1631, Toledo) was a Spanish painter and architect. He was the only son of the iconic painter, Doménikos Theotokópoulos, called "El Greco".

== Biography ==
He learned his trade working in the studios of his father. Around 1603, he participated in creating custom altarpieces in Illescas; his first documented work. Later, in 1607, he began to work more independently, producing an altarpiece in Titulcia which, although generally done in his father's style, showed a glimmer of his own personality.

After his father's death in 1614, he focused on his interest in architecture, working mostly in the Herrerian style, as practiced by Nicolás de Vergara el Mozo and Juan Bautista Monegro. From 1612 to 1618, he was involved in completing construction on the Casa Consistorial (City Hall) of Toledo.

A few years later, in 1625, he became the Master Builder, sculptor and architect for the Toledo Cathedral, where he worked on construction of the cupola of the Mozarabic Chapel, originally designed by Enrique Egas in 1519, and the Chapel of the Eighths (Ochavo). He was also involved in a few somewhat less serious projects, such as designing a comedy theater called the "Mesón de la Fruta", which was demolished in the 1870s.

He eventually came to financial ruin from a dispute with the Hospital de Tavera, where his father had left a major commission uncompleted. The affair ended with the seizure of his property.

== Gallery ==
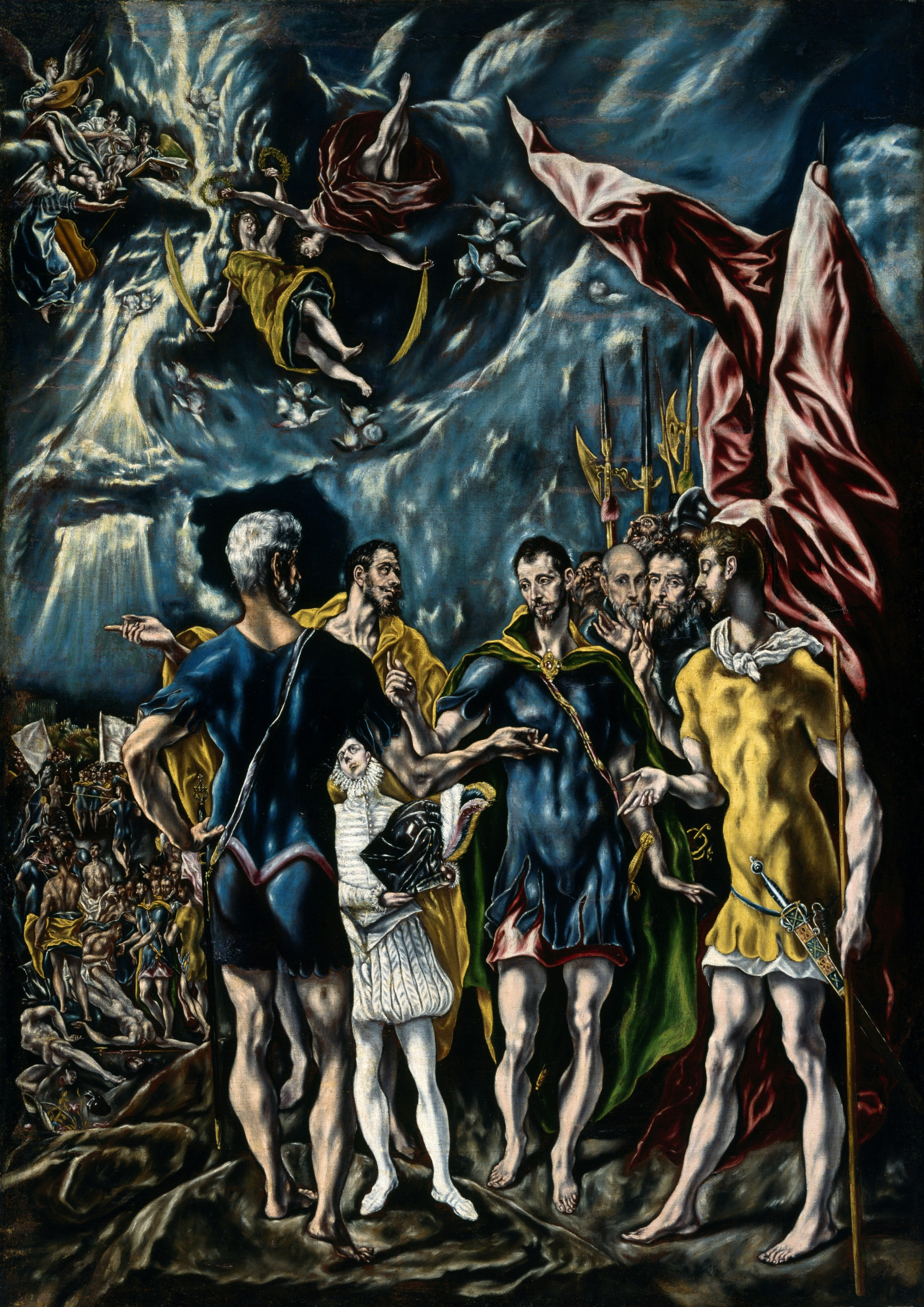
The Martyrdom of Saint Maurice

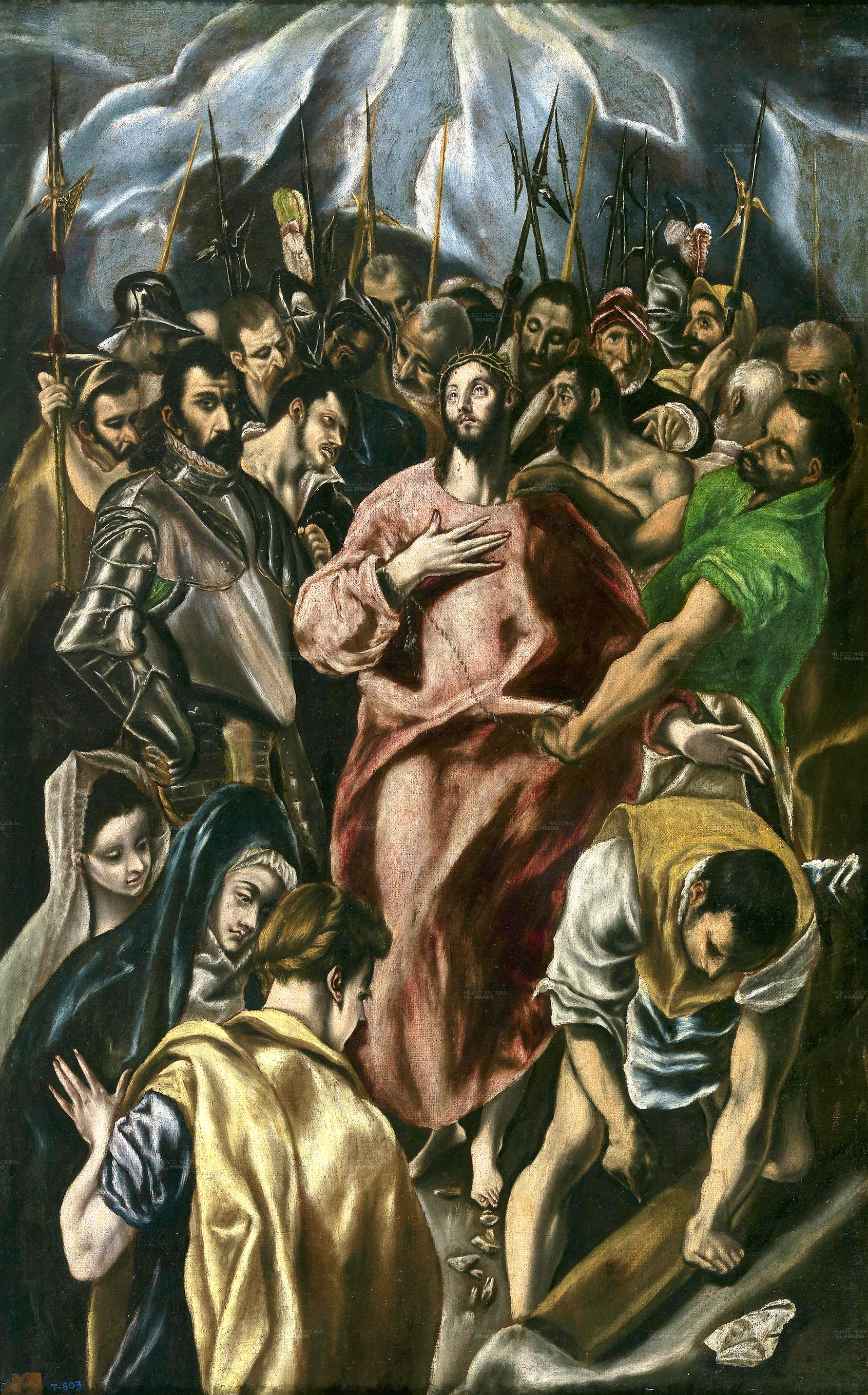
Christ Removing His Robe

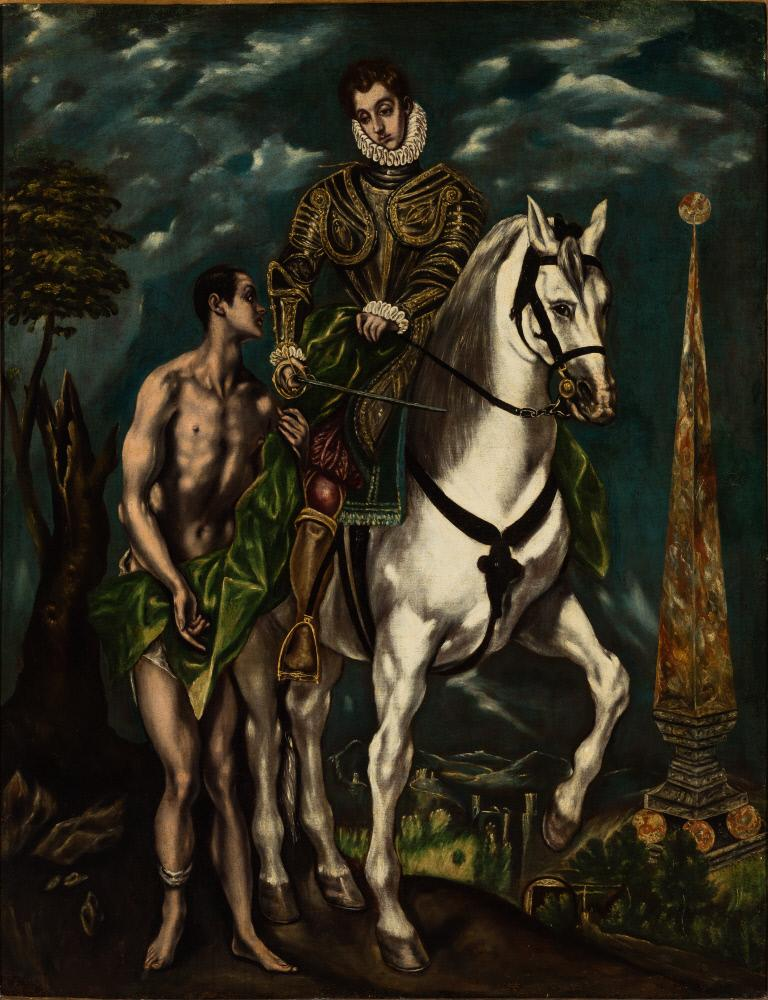
Saint Martin and the Beggar

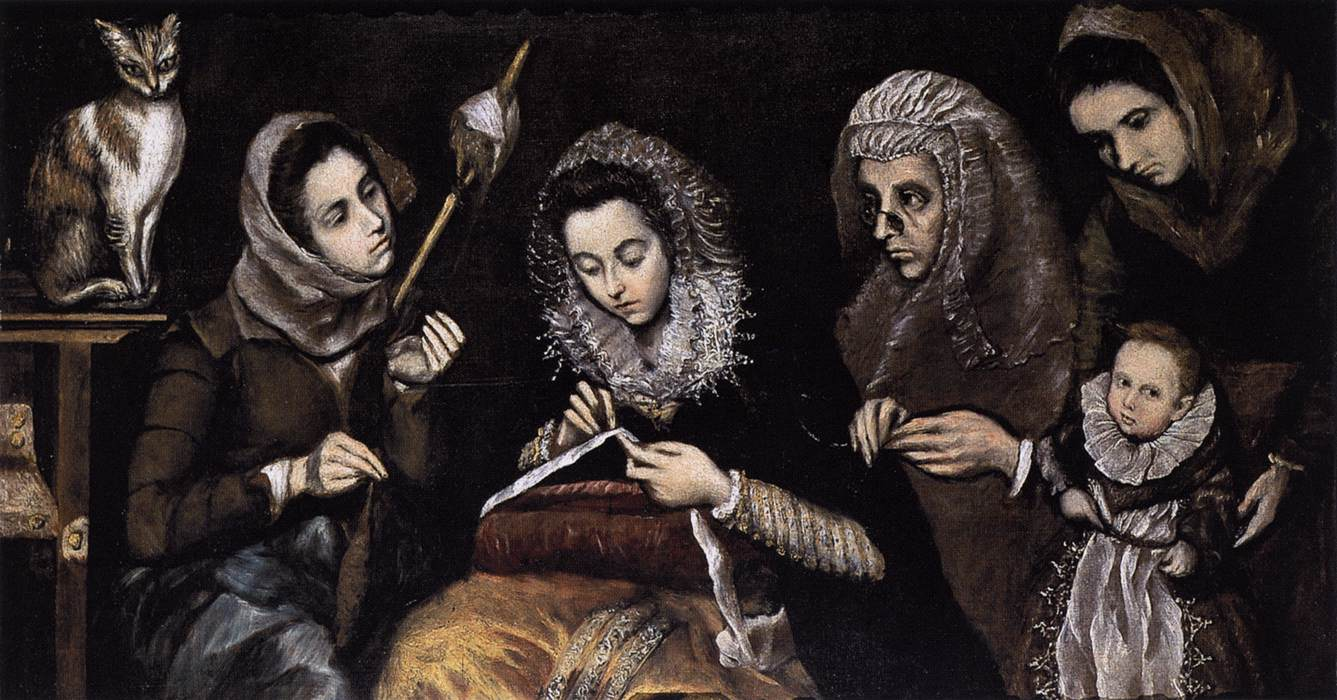
The Family of El Greco (c.1605)

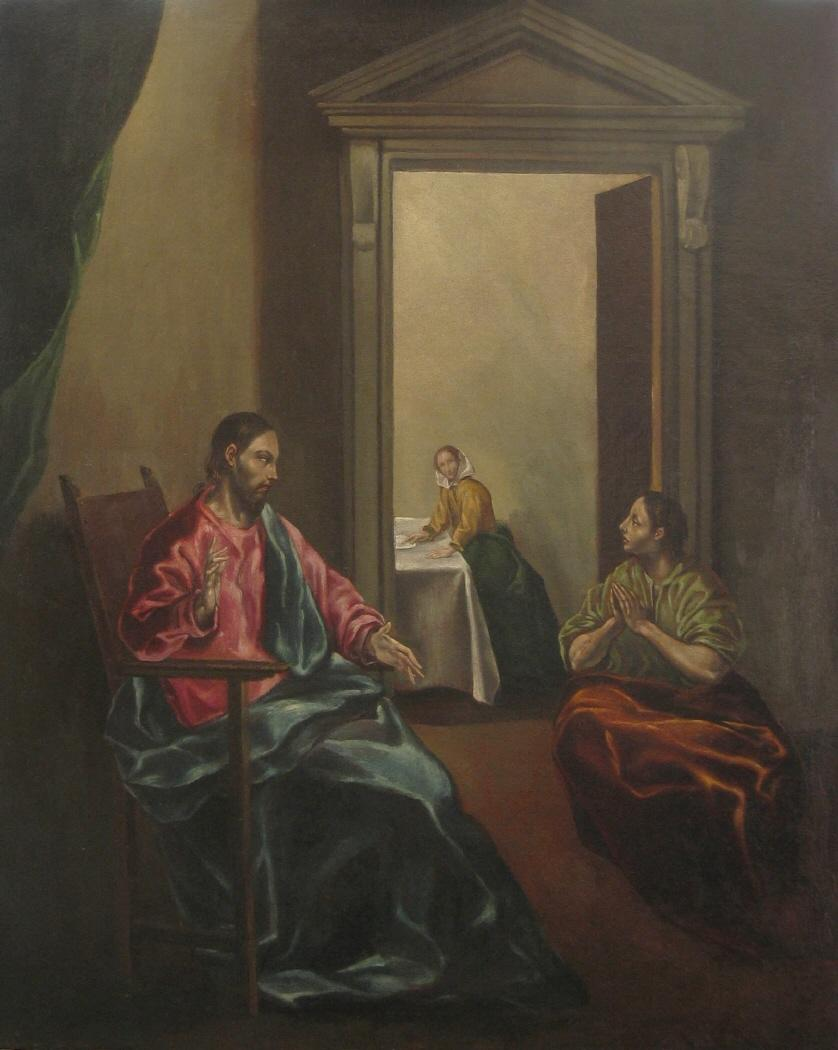
Christ in the House of Martha

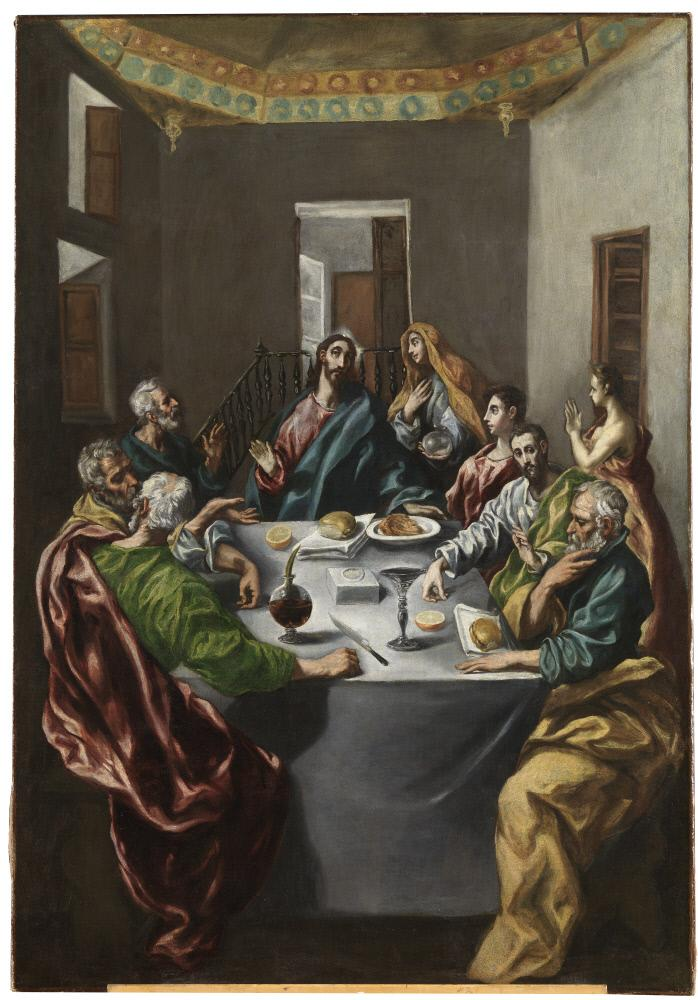
Supper in the House of Simon

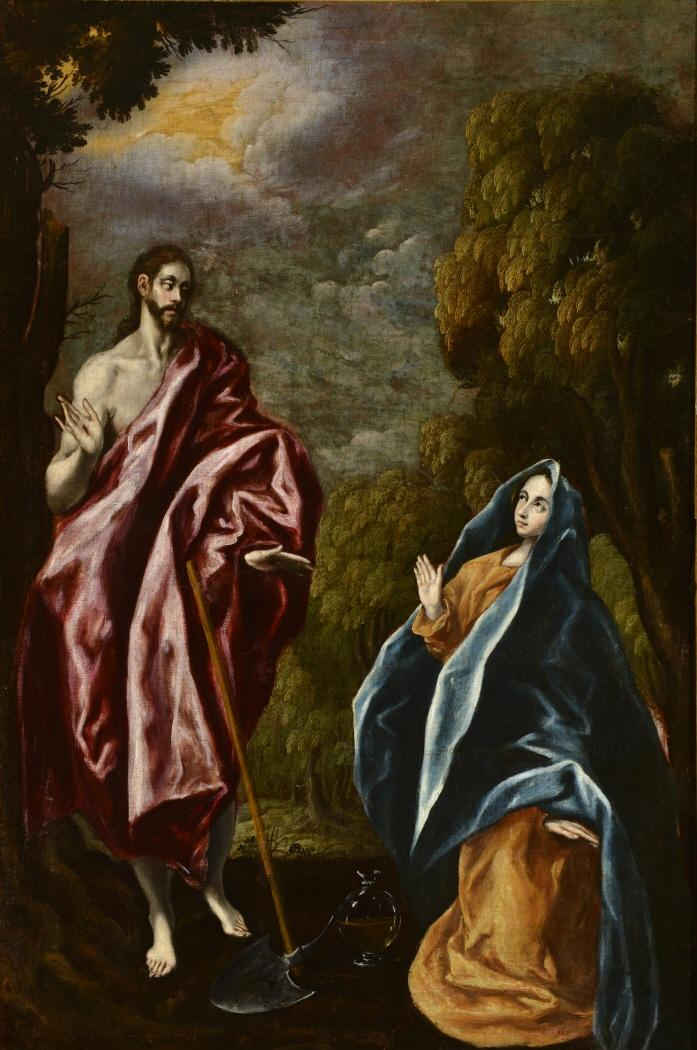
Noli me tangere
