= Adoration of the Shepherds =

Episode in the story of Jesus's nativity

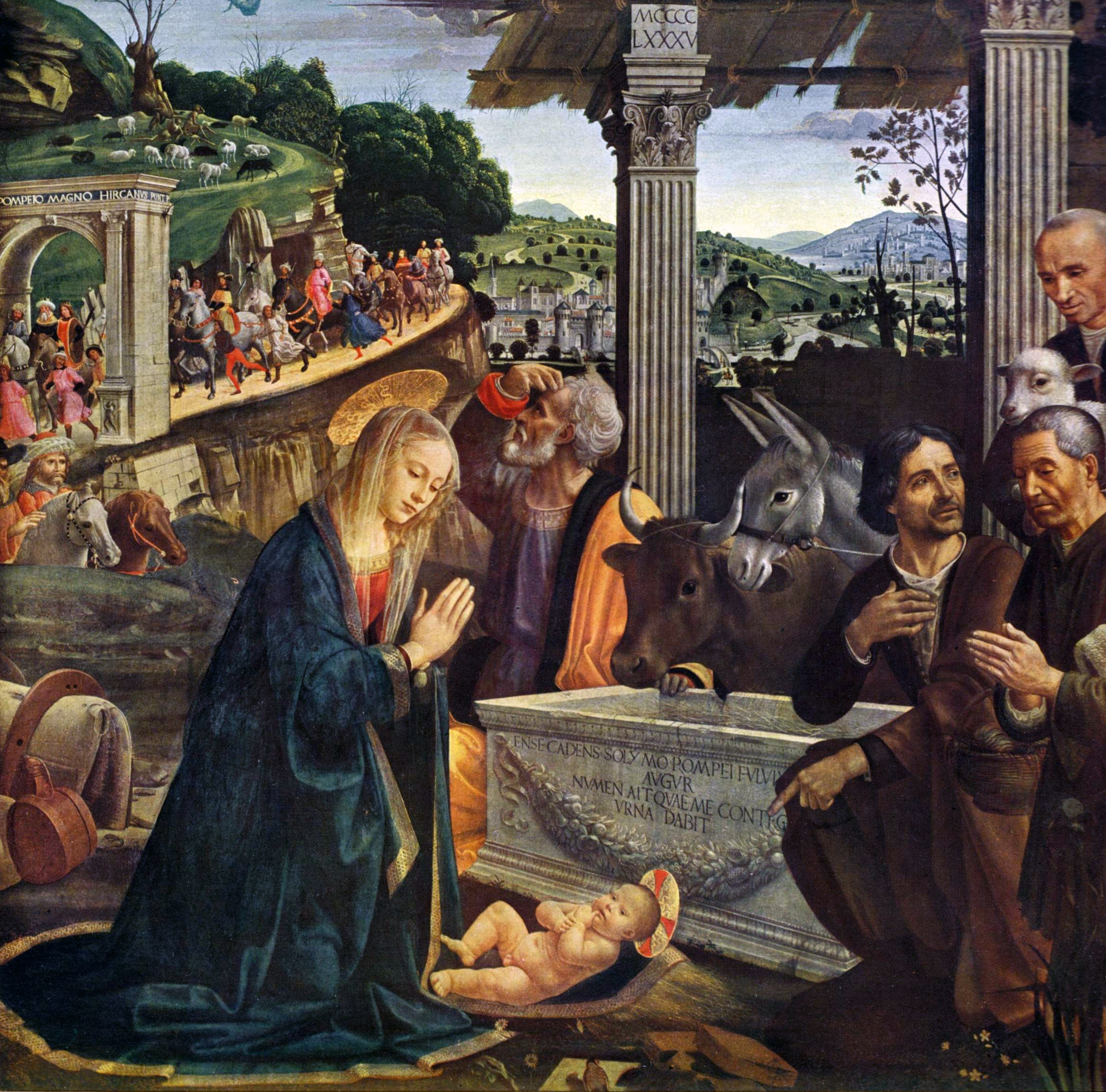
Adoration of the Shepherds by Domenico Ghirlandaio, 1485

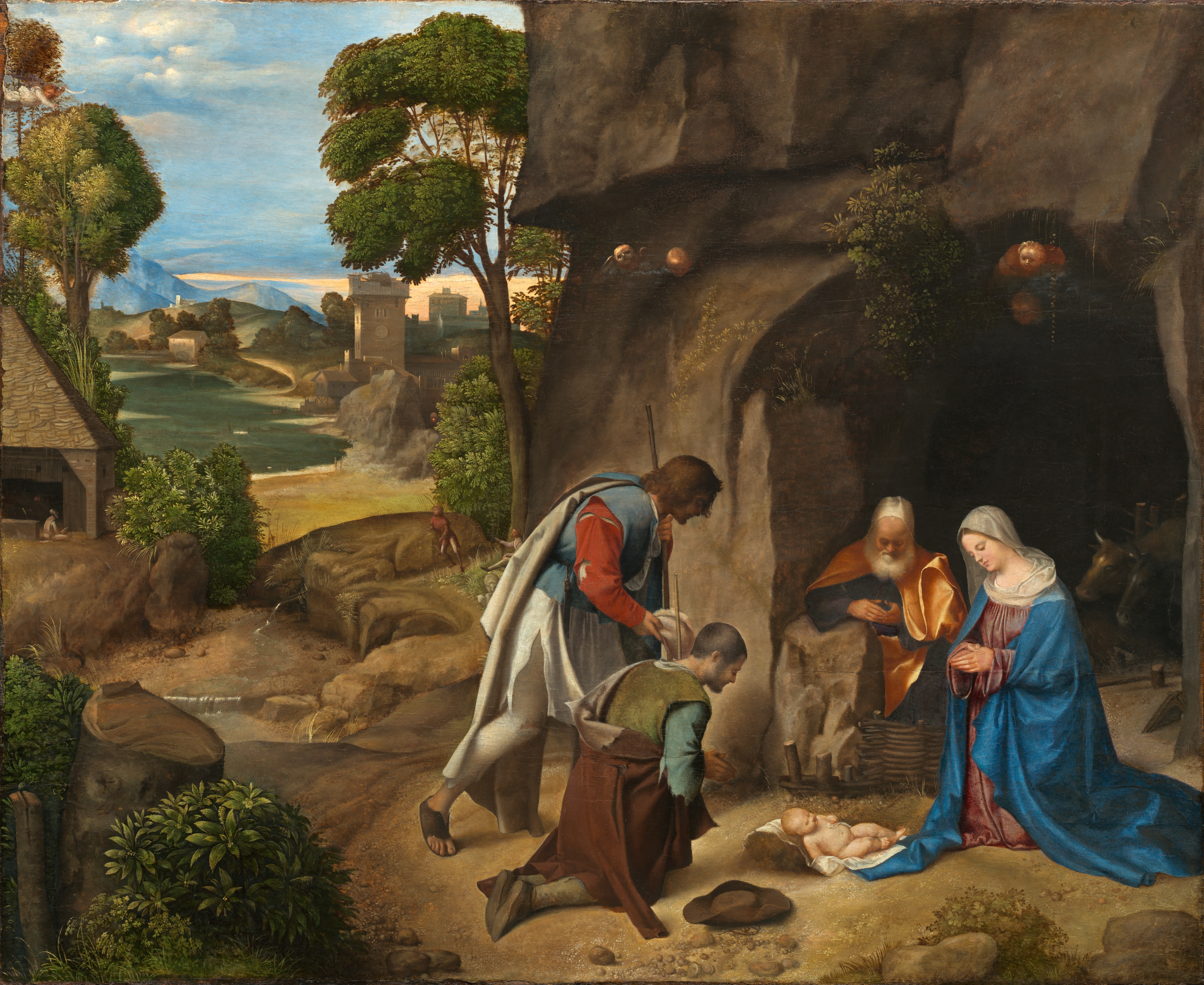
Adoration of the Shepherds by Giorgione, 1510

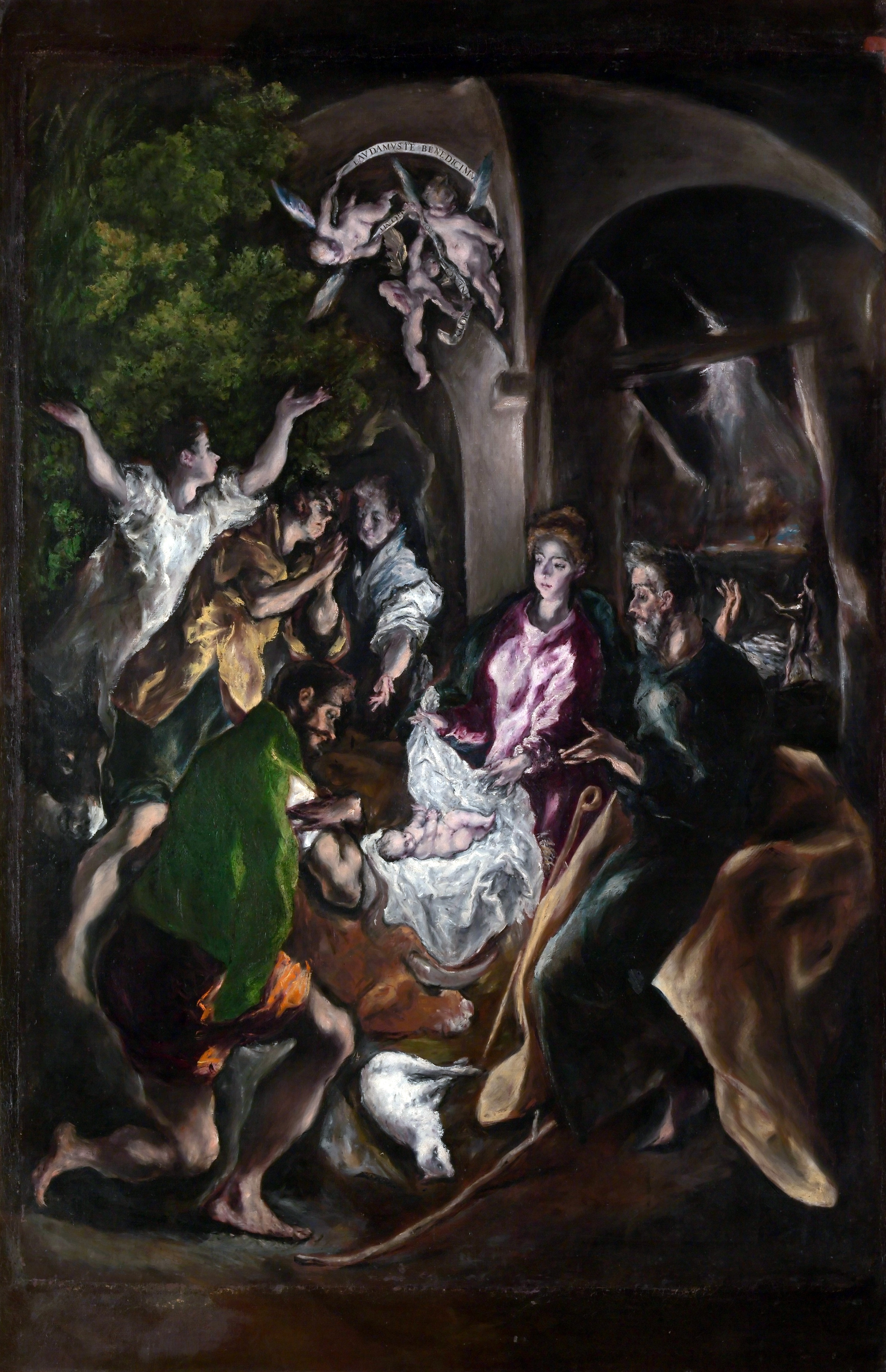
The Adoration of the Shepherds by El Greco, c. 1605–1610

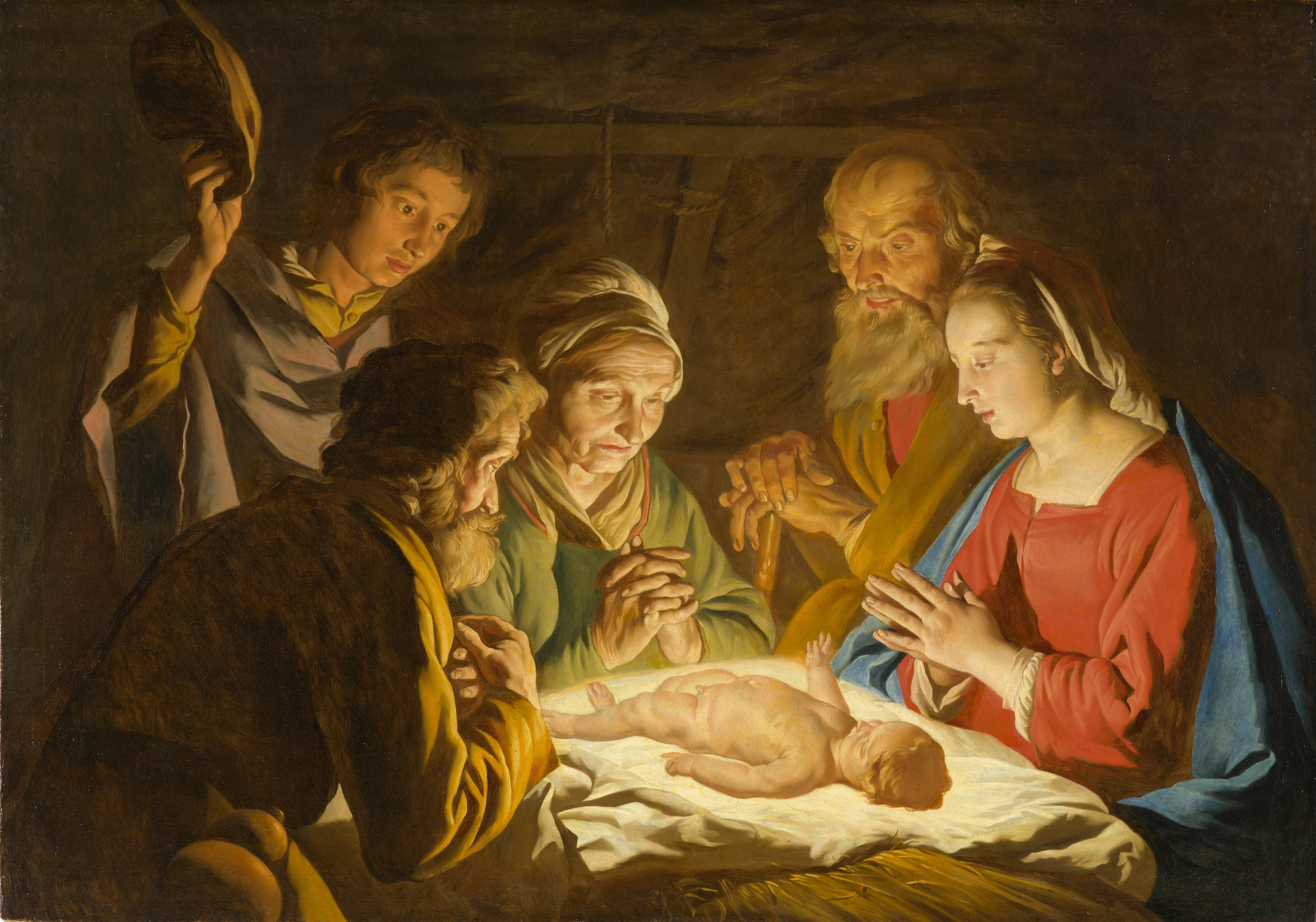
Adoration of the Shepherds by Matthias Stom, c. 1635–1640

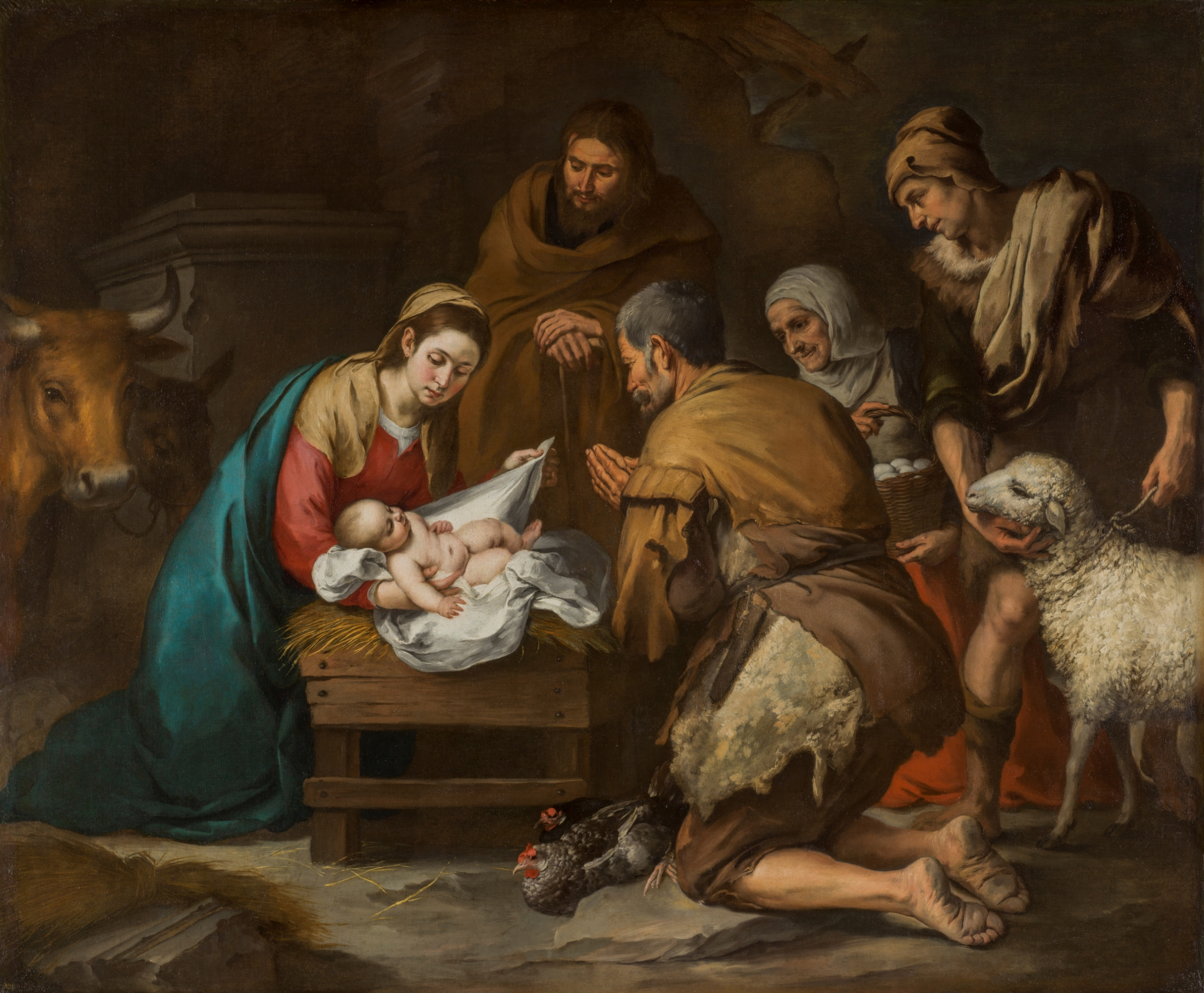
Adoration of the Shepherds by Bartolomé Esteban Murillo, c. 1657

The Adoration of the Shepherds is the traditional name for a New Testament episode in the story of Jesus's nativity, which is the subject of many works of art. In it shepherds are near witnesses to Jesus's birth in Bethlehem, arriving soon after he is actually born. The episode is recounted, or at least implied, in the Gospel of Luke and follows on from the annunciation to the shepherds, in which the shepherds are summoned by an angel to the scene of the birth. Like the episode preceding it, the adoration is a common subject in art, where it is often combined with the Adoration of the Magi. In such cases it is typically just referred to by the latter title.

As well as many paintings and sculptures, the episode features in much Christmas music, both carols and classical music.

== Biblical narrative ==
The adoration is an episode in the nativity narrative of the Gospel of Luke. Shepherds are watching their flocks by night, apparently near Bethlehem, when an angel appears to announce the good news that "today in the City of David a Saviour has been born to you; he is the Messiah, the Lord". The angelic promise is accompanied by a sign: they will find the saviour in the form of "a baby wrapped in cloths and lying in a manger". "Suddenly a great company of the heavenly host" (the Greek word used here indicates a military formation, an army) appeared and joined the angel, singing "Glory to God in the highest heaven, and peace among those of good will".

^{15} When the angels had left them and gone into heaven, the shepherds said to one another, "Let us go now to Bethlehem and see this thing that has taken place, which the Lord has made known to us." ^{16} So they went with haste and found Mary and Joseph, and the child lying in the manger.

The Annunciation to the Shepherds, which precedes the adoration, forms a distinct subject in Christian art and is sometimes included in a nativity scene as a peripheral feature (even though it occurs before the adoration itself), as in the 1485 scene by Domenico Ghirlandaio, where it can be seen in the upper left corner. Ghirlandaio also shows a procession of Magi about to arrive with their gifts.

== Biblical commentary ==
Roger Baxter reflects on verse 15 ("Let us go to Bethlehem..."), writing, "Observe the prompt obedience of the shepherds, and learn thence to obey with promptitude the divine inspirations." For they came with haste. No one can see Christ slothfully," says St. Ambrose.

The Venerable Bede makes a similar comment: "The shepherds hasten, for the presence of Christ must not be sought with sluggishness; and many perchance that seek Christ do not merit to find Him, because they seek Him slothfully."

== In art ==
The scene is very commonly combined with the Adoration of the Magi, which makes for a balanced composition, as the two groups often occupy opposite sides of the image space around the central figures, and represent the theological interpretation of the episode where the two groups – Jewish and gentile – represented the peoples of the world between them. This combination is first found in the 6th-century Monza ampullae made in Byzantine Palaestina Prima.

The depiction of the Adoration of the Shepherds as a subject distinct from that of the Magi began to appear in the western Christian world in around the 15th century. The shepherds are sometimes shown presenting simpler gifts to Jesus than those of the Magi, such as lambs. In Italian Renaissance painting, drawing on classical stories of Orpheus, the shepherds are sometimes depicted with musical instruments. Alternatively, it has been argued that this motif derives from a custom of playing the pipes before images of the Virgin and Child at Christmas in parts of Italy. A charming but atypical miniature in the La Flora Hours in Naples shows the shepherds playing to the Christ Child, as a delighted Virgin Mary stands to one side. It became a common theme in altarpieces as well as other art forms.

Many artists have depicted the subject. Famous examples include:

- Correggio, Adoration of the Shepherds, Gemäldegalerie Alte Meister, Dresden
- Caravaggio, Adoration of the Shepherds, Museo Regionale, Messina
- Domenichino, Adoration of the Shepherds, Scottish National Gallery, Edinburgh
- Giorgione, Allendale Nativity, National Gallery of Art, Washington, D.C.
- El Greco, Adoration of the Shepherds, Museo del Prado, Madrid
- Le Nain brothers, Adoration of the Shepherds, National Gallery, London
- Hugo van der Goes, Portinari Triptych, Galleria degli Uffizi, Florence
- Lorenzo di Credi, Adoration of the Shepherds, also Uffizi
- Andrea Mantegna, Adoration of the Shepherds, Metropolitan Museum of Art, New York
- Edward Burne-Jones's stained-glass windows in Trinity Church, Boston
- Giotto, in the Scrovegni Chapel, Padua
- Georges de La Tour, Louvre, Paris
- Bartolomé Esteban Murillo, Hermitage Museum, Saint Petersburg
- Nicolas Poussin and Rembrandt, National Gallery, London
- Guido Reni, Adoration of the Shepherds, Certosa di San Martino, Naples
- Martin Schongauer, Berlin
- Domenico Ghirlandaio, Sassetti Chapel, Santa Trinita, Florence
- Gerard van Honthorst, Wallraf-Richartz Museum, Cologne

== Christmas carols ==
Several well-known Christmas carols mention the Adoration of the Shepherds. Some of these do so along the lines of urging the listener to come to Bethlehem such as the "Shepherd's Pipe Carol". The modern "Calypso Carol" has the lines "Shepherds swiftly from your stupor rise / to see the Saviour of the world," and the chorus "O now carry me to Bethlehem." "Angels We Have Heard on High" says, "Come to Bethlehem and see / Him Whose birth the angels sing."

"O Come, All Ye Faithful" ("Adeste Fideles" in the Latin version) has a verse which runs:

See how the shepherds,
Summoned to His cradle,
Leaving their flocks, draw nigh to gaze;
We too will thither
Bend our joyful footsteps.

Other carols which mention the Adoration of the Shepherds include "Silent Night", "What Child Is This?", "Infant Holy, Infant Lowly", "I Wonder as I Wander", and "O Come, Little Children". The German carol "Vom Himmel hoch, da komm ich her" ("From Heaven Above to Earth I Come") contains several stanzas on the subject of following the shepherds and celebrating the newborn baby. The Czech carol "Nesem vám noviny ("Come, All Ye Shepherds", in German "Kommet, ihr Hirten") concerns the adoration of the shepherds; the middle verse of Mari Ruef Hofer's English version runs:

Hasten then, hasten to Bethlehem's stall,
There to see heaven descend to us all.
With holy feeling, there humbly kneeling,
We will adore Him, bow down before Him,
Worship the King.

== Gallery ==
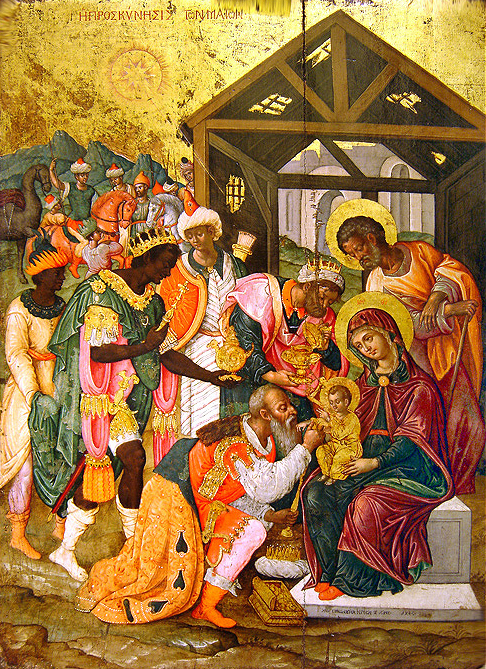
Adoration of the Magi in the Byzantine and Christian Museum in Athens

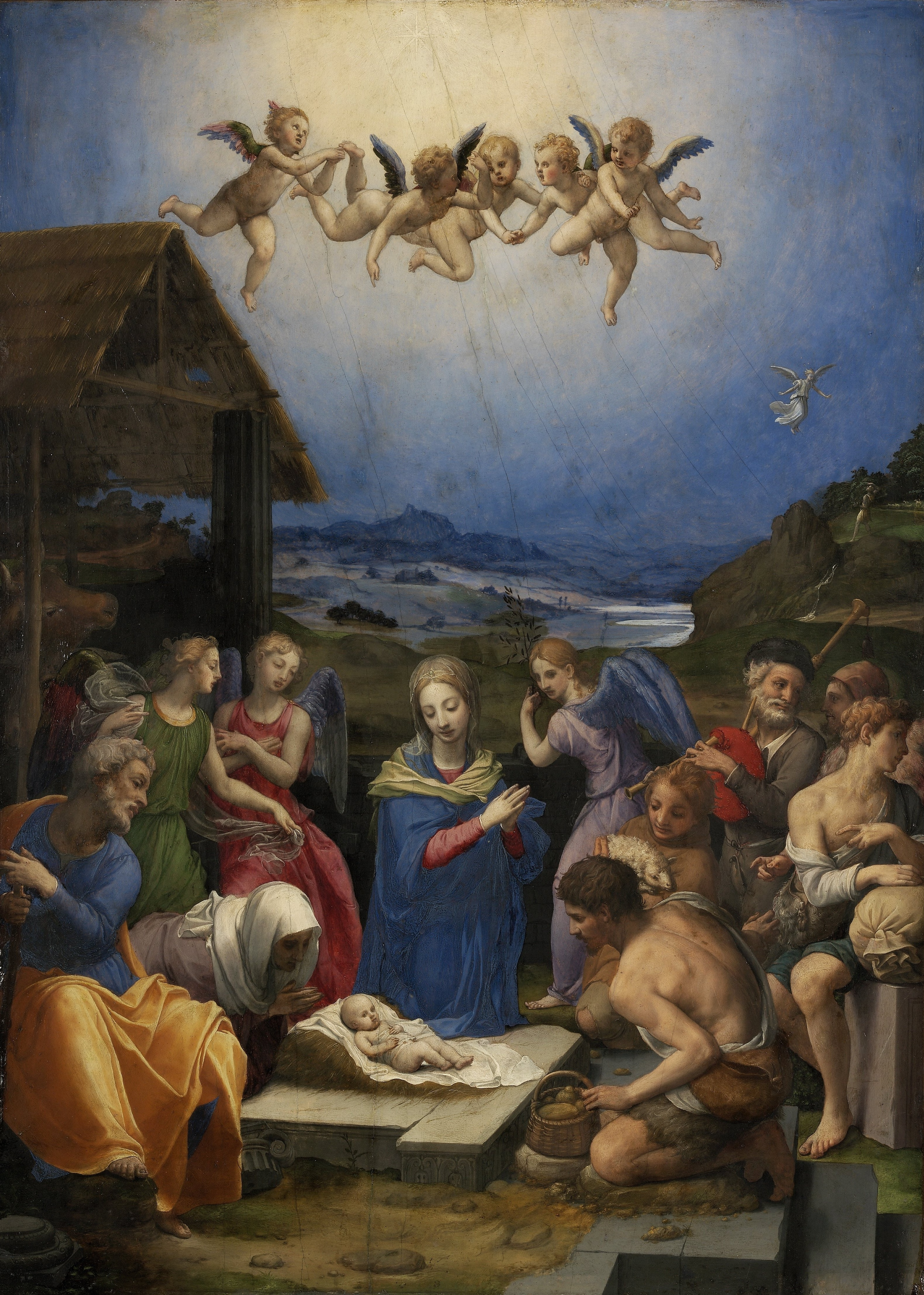
Bronzino

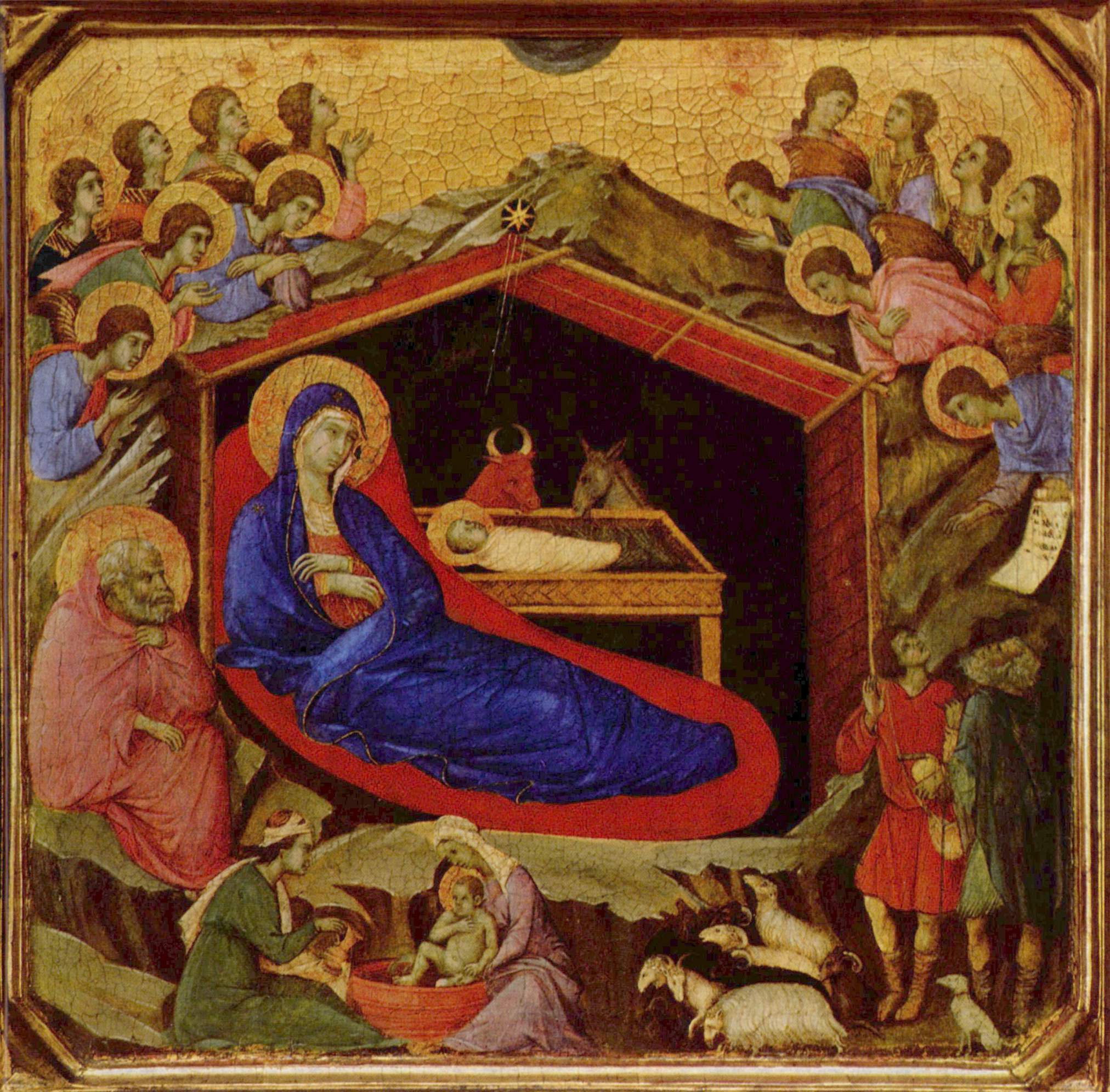
Duccio di Buoninsegna, 1308–1311

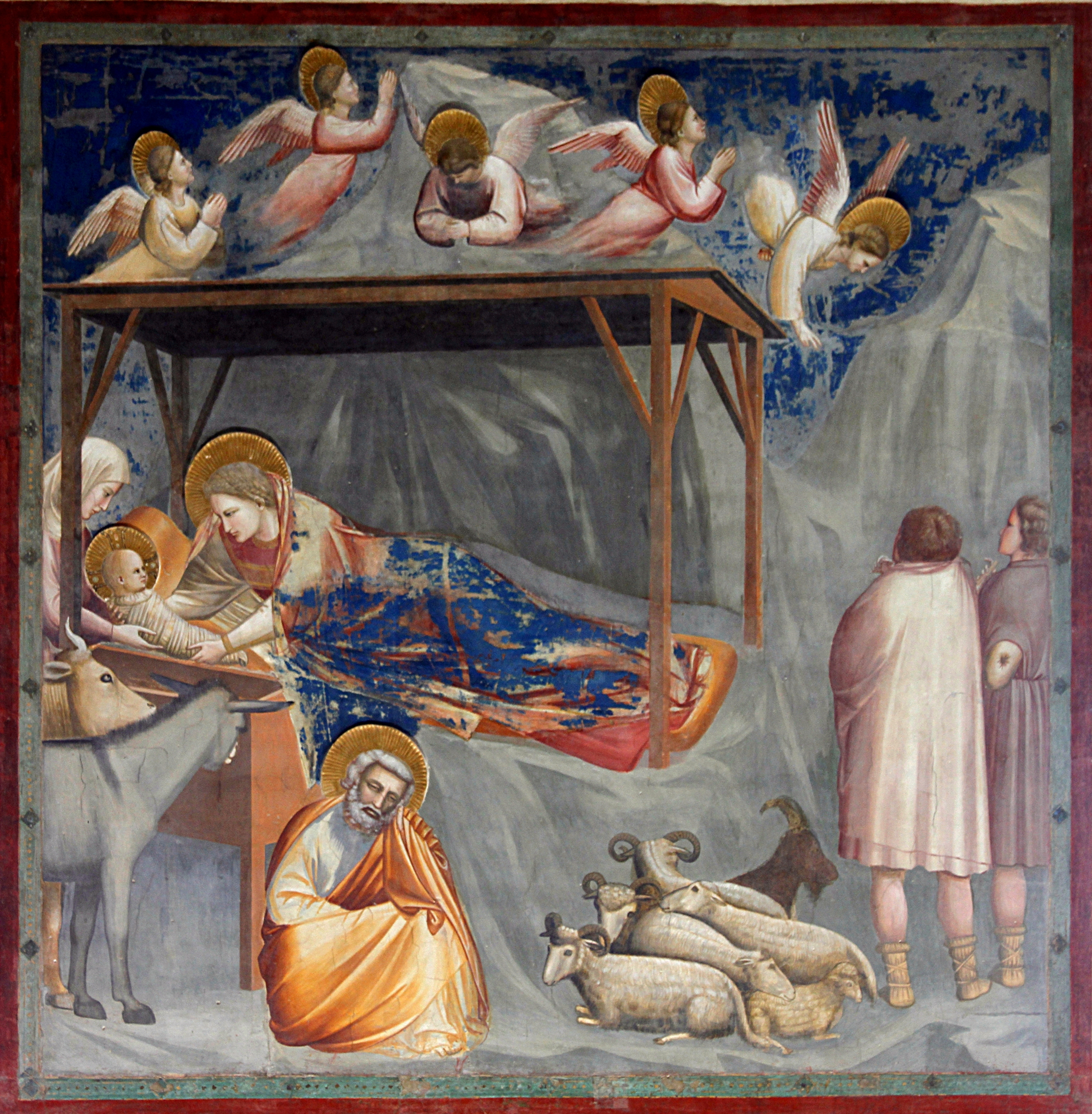
Giotto, c. 1320

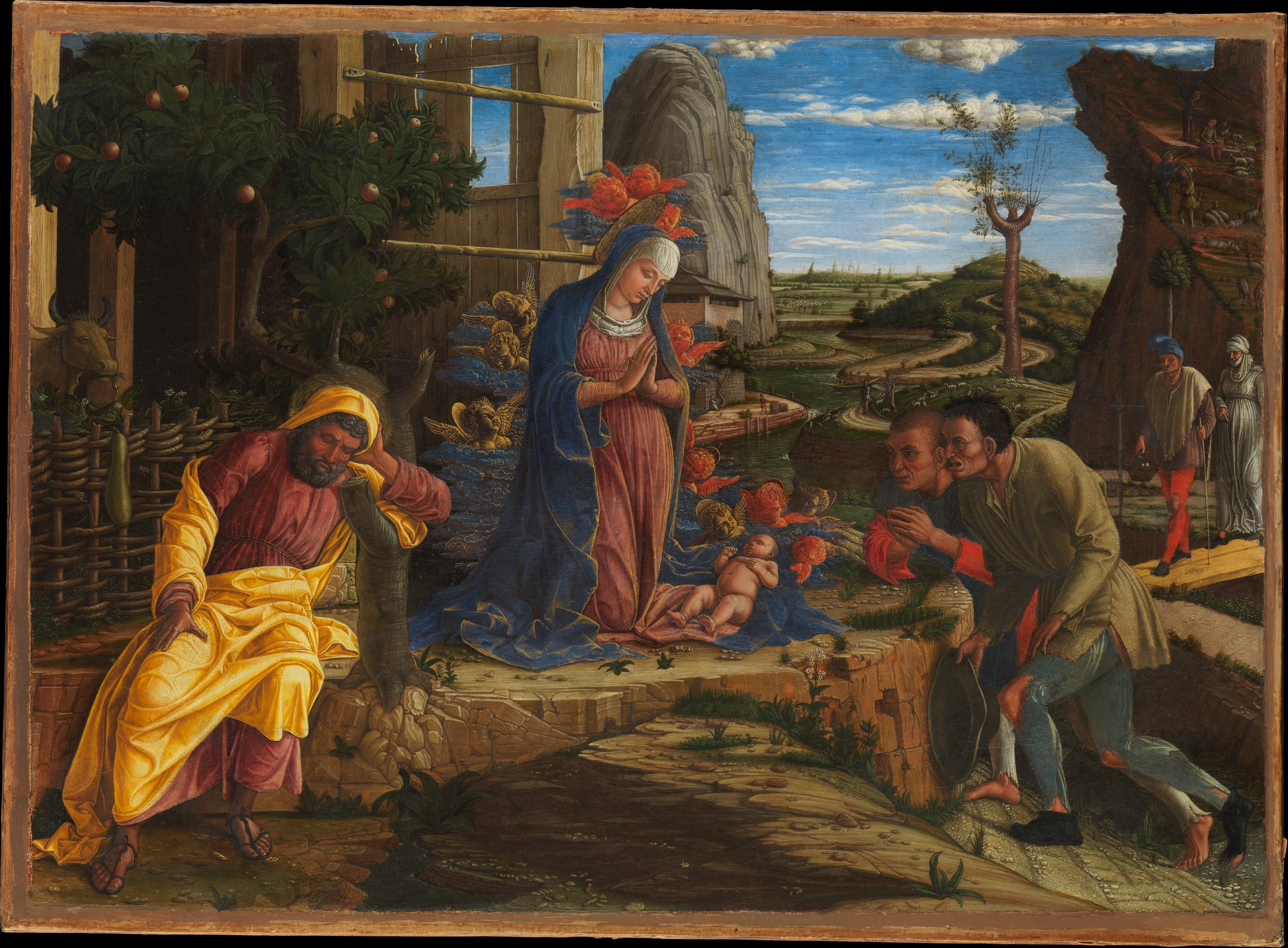
Andrea Mantegna, 1451–1453

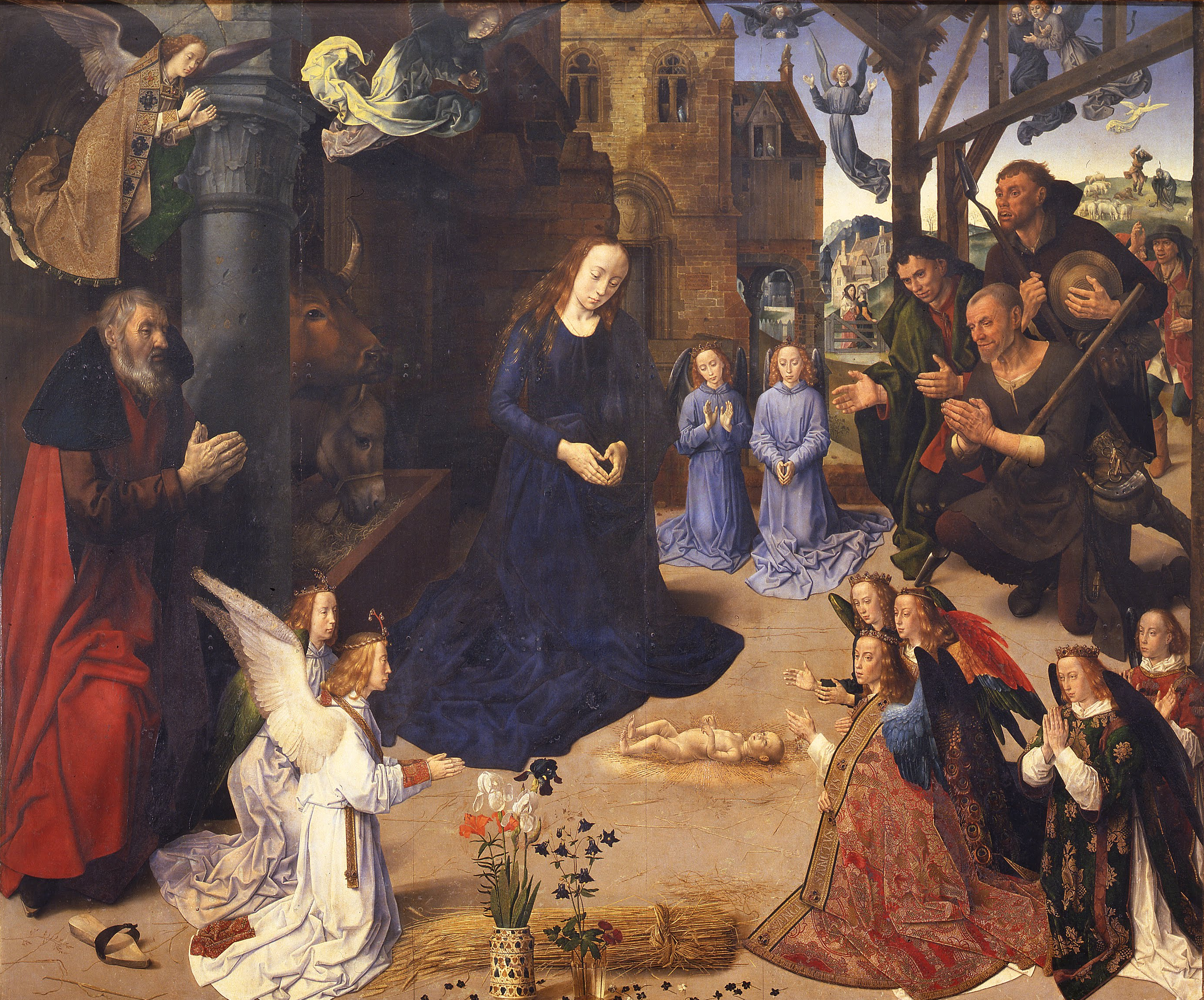
Hugo van der Goes c. 1475

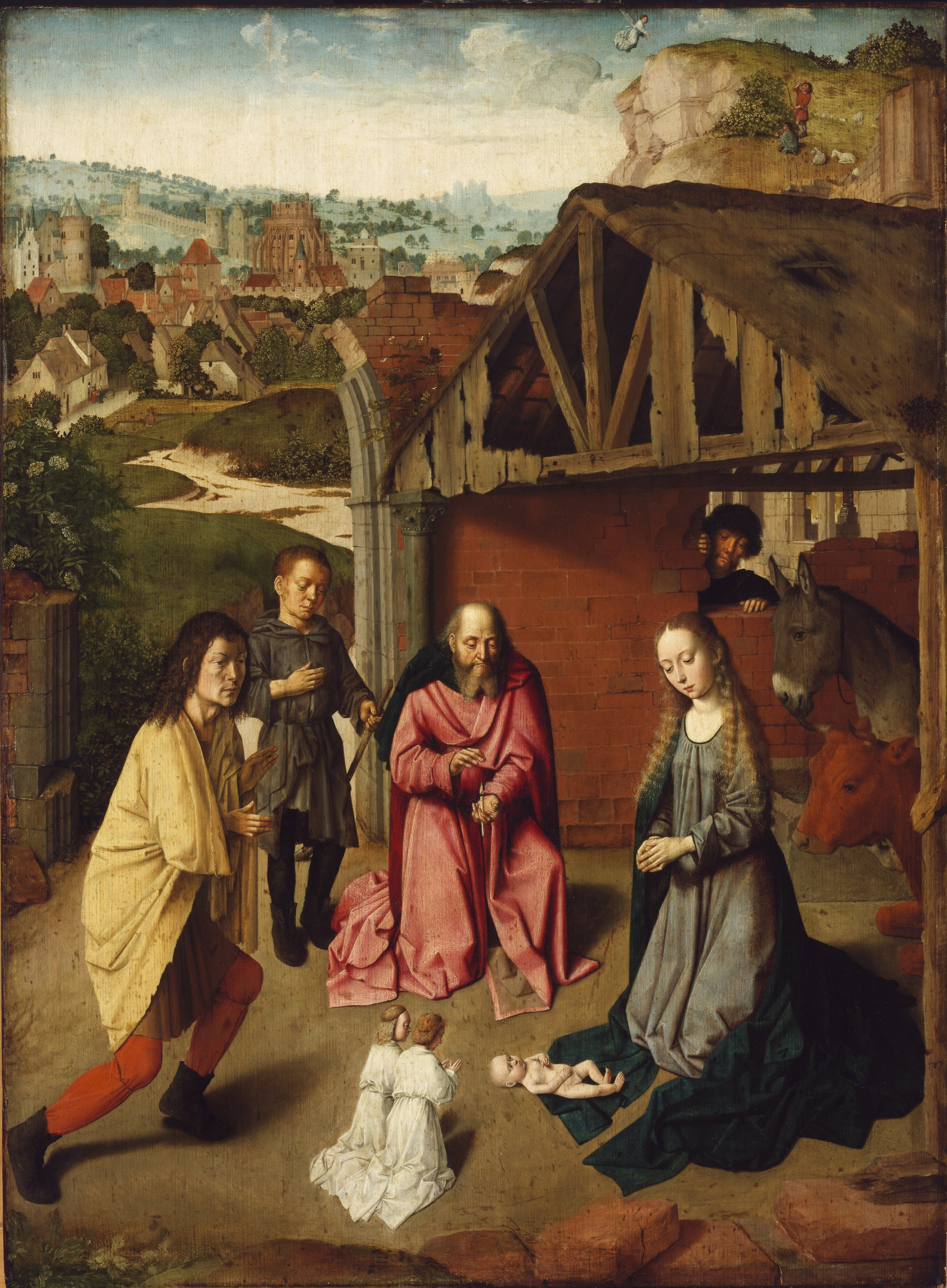
Gerard David, c. 1485

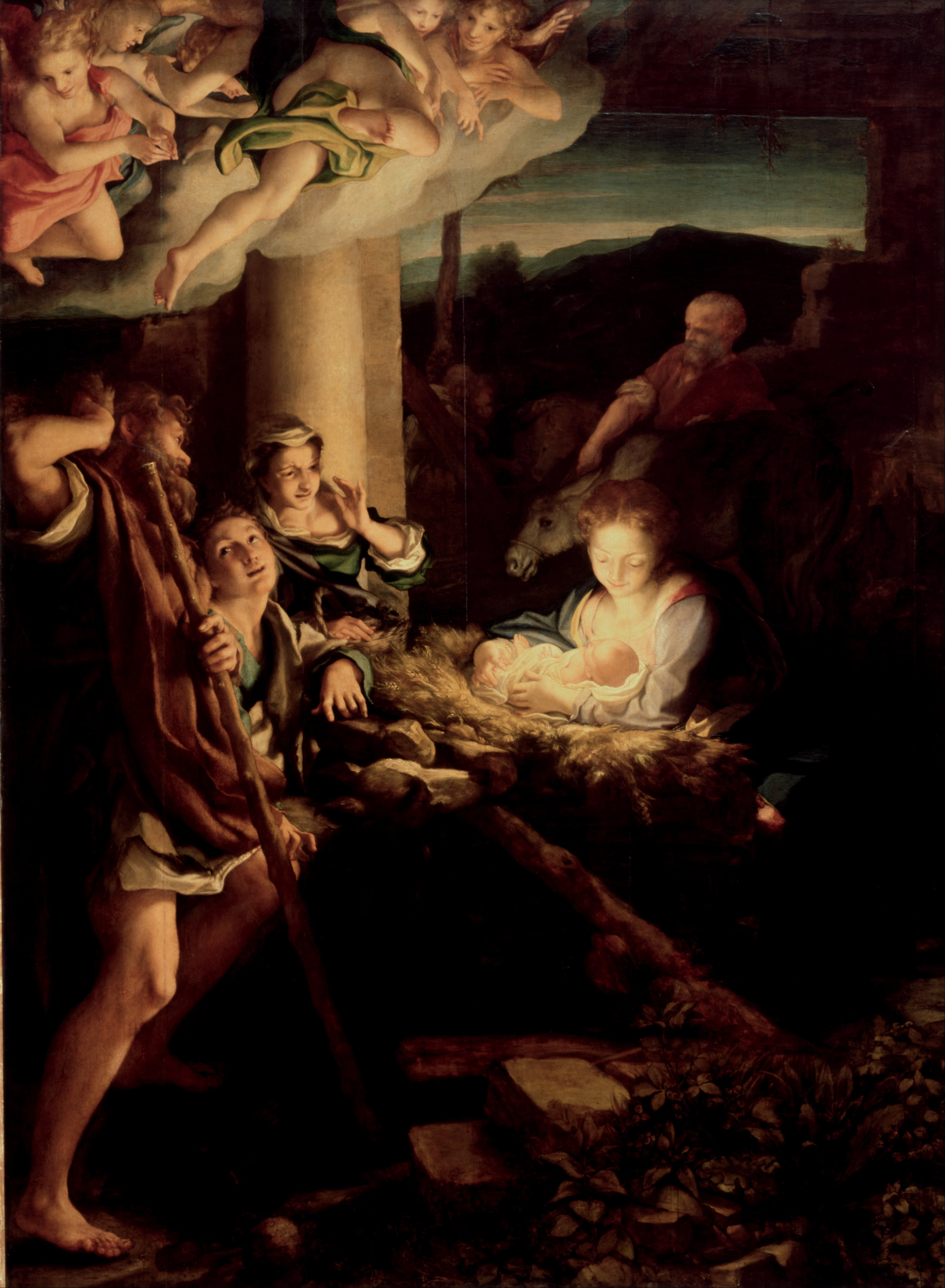
Correggio, 1529

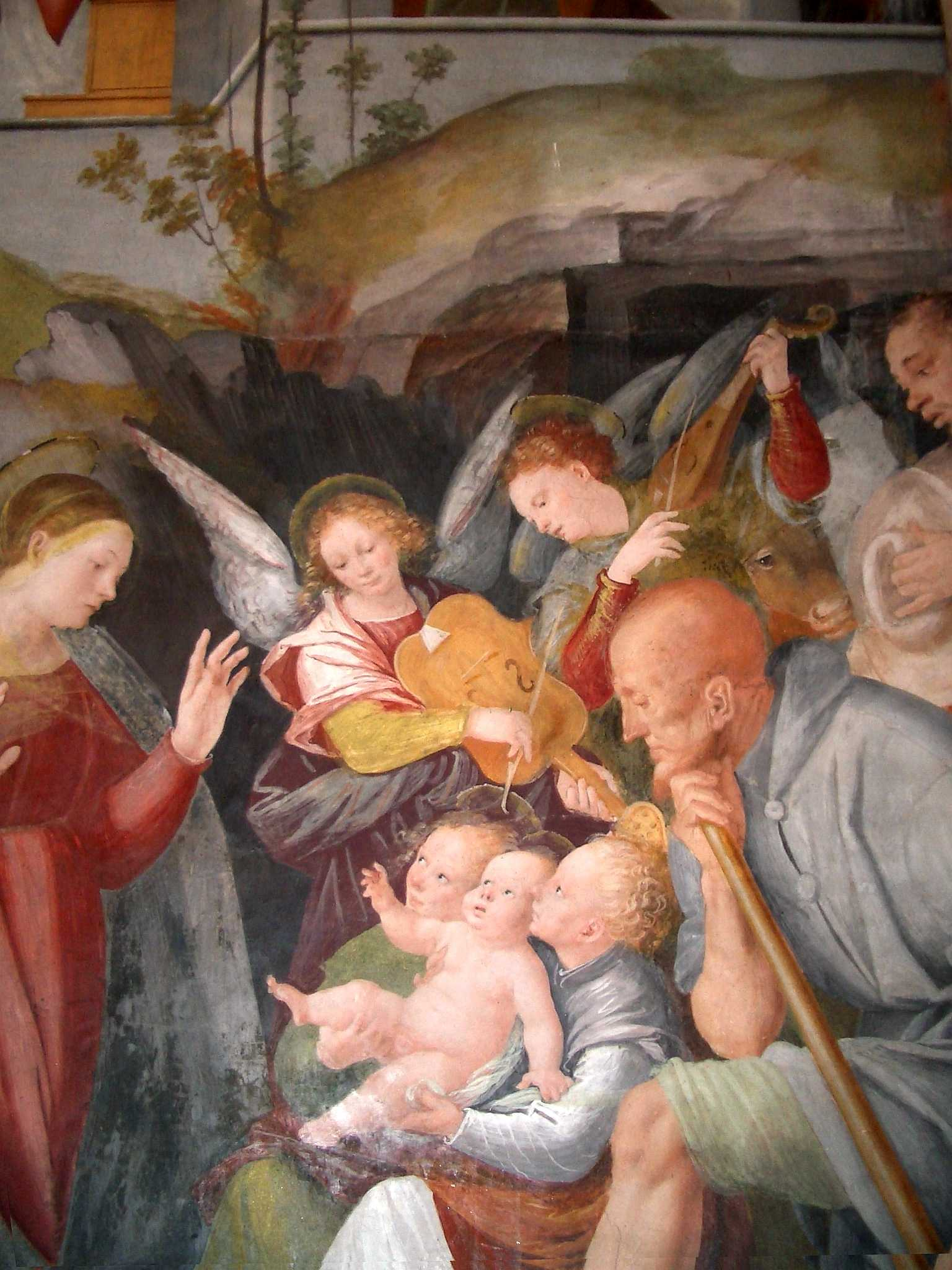
Gaudenzio Ferrari c. 1533

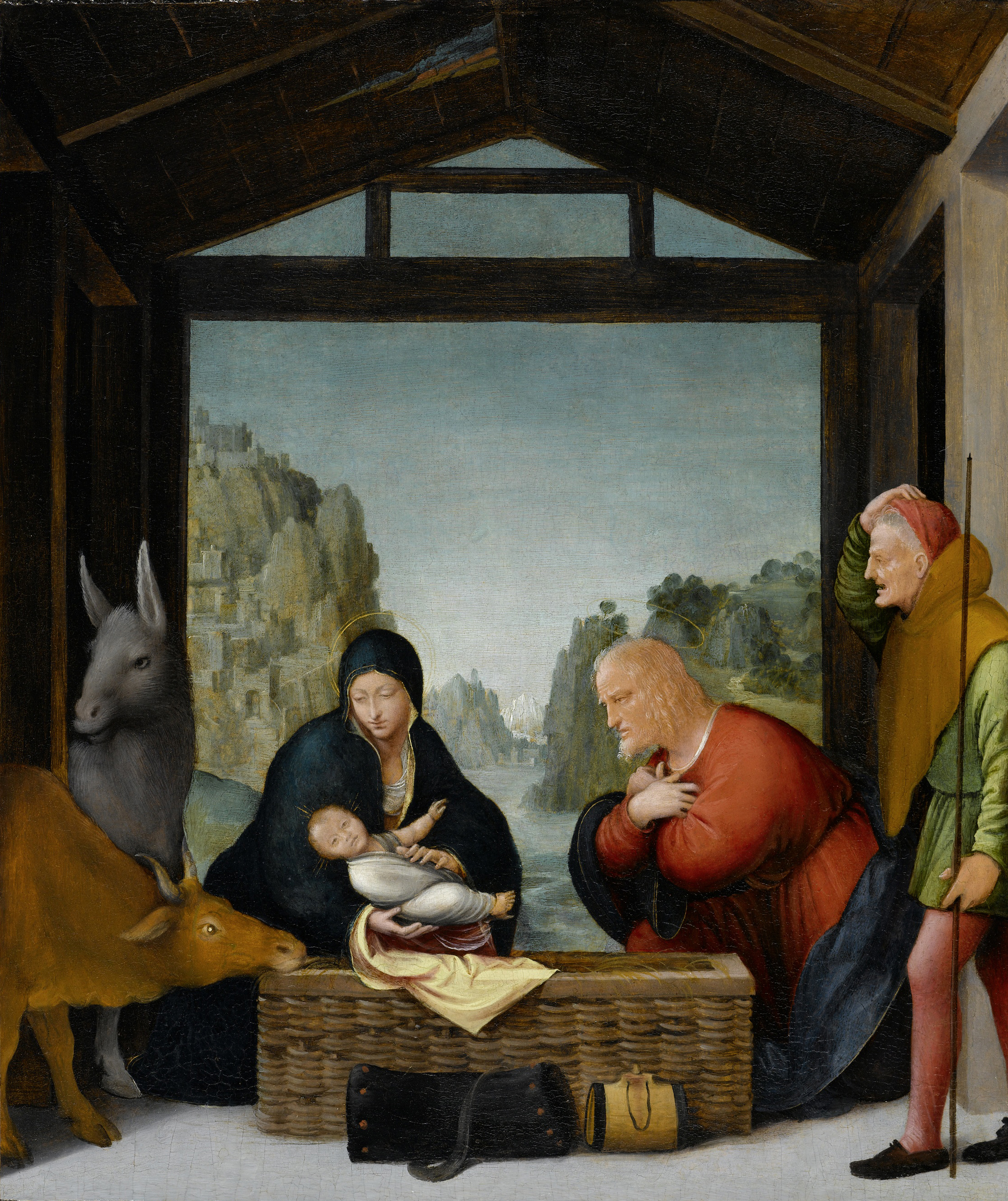
Bramantino between 1500 and 1535

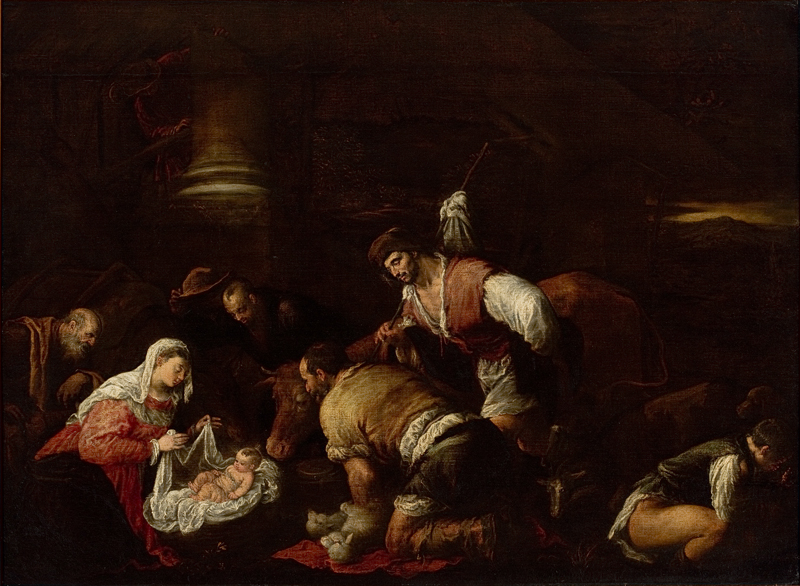
Jacopo Bassano, 1580

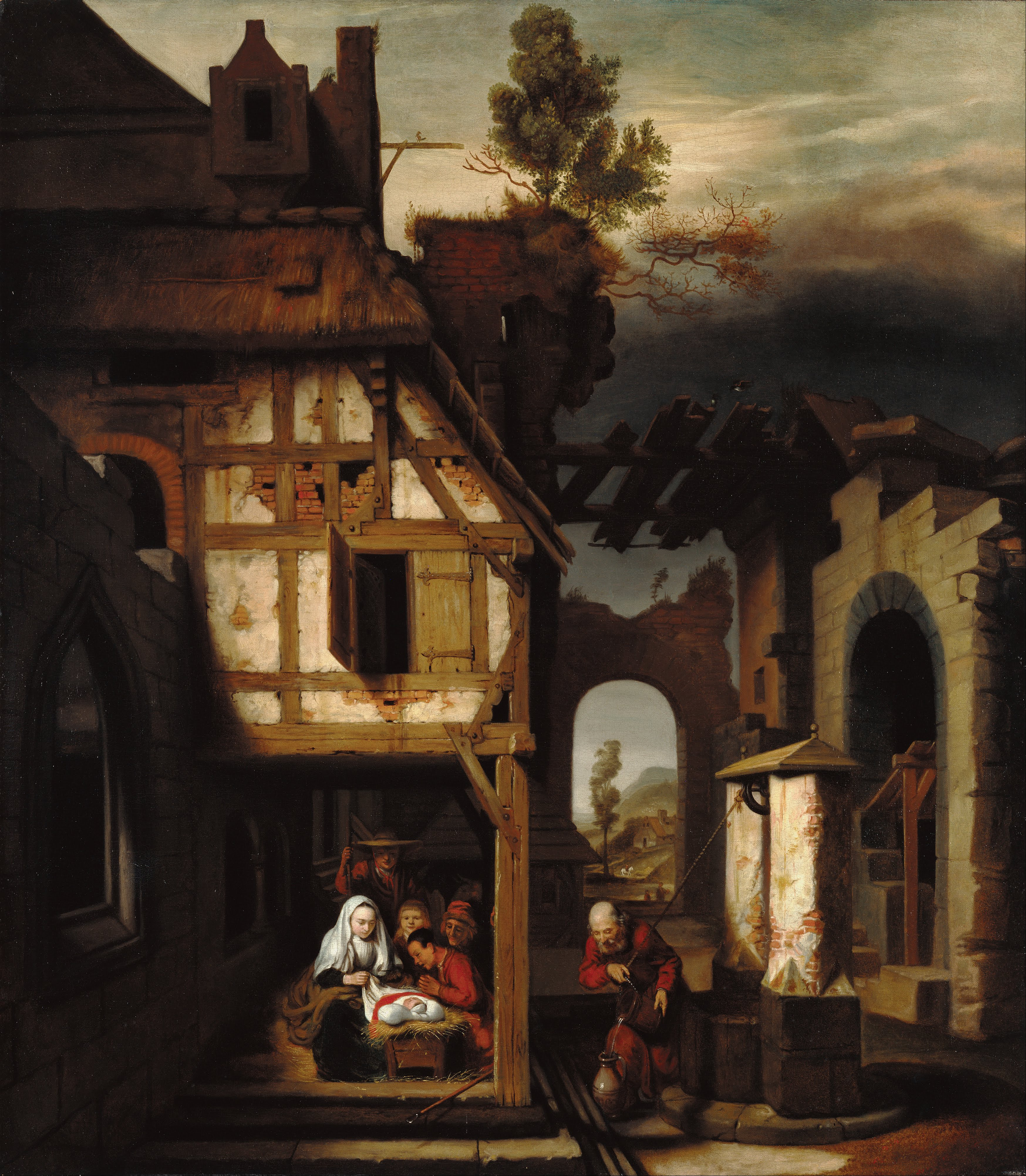
Nicolaes Maes, 1660–1590

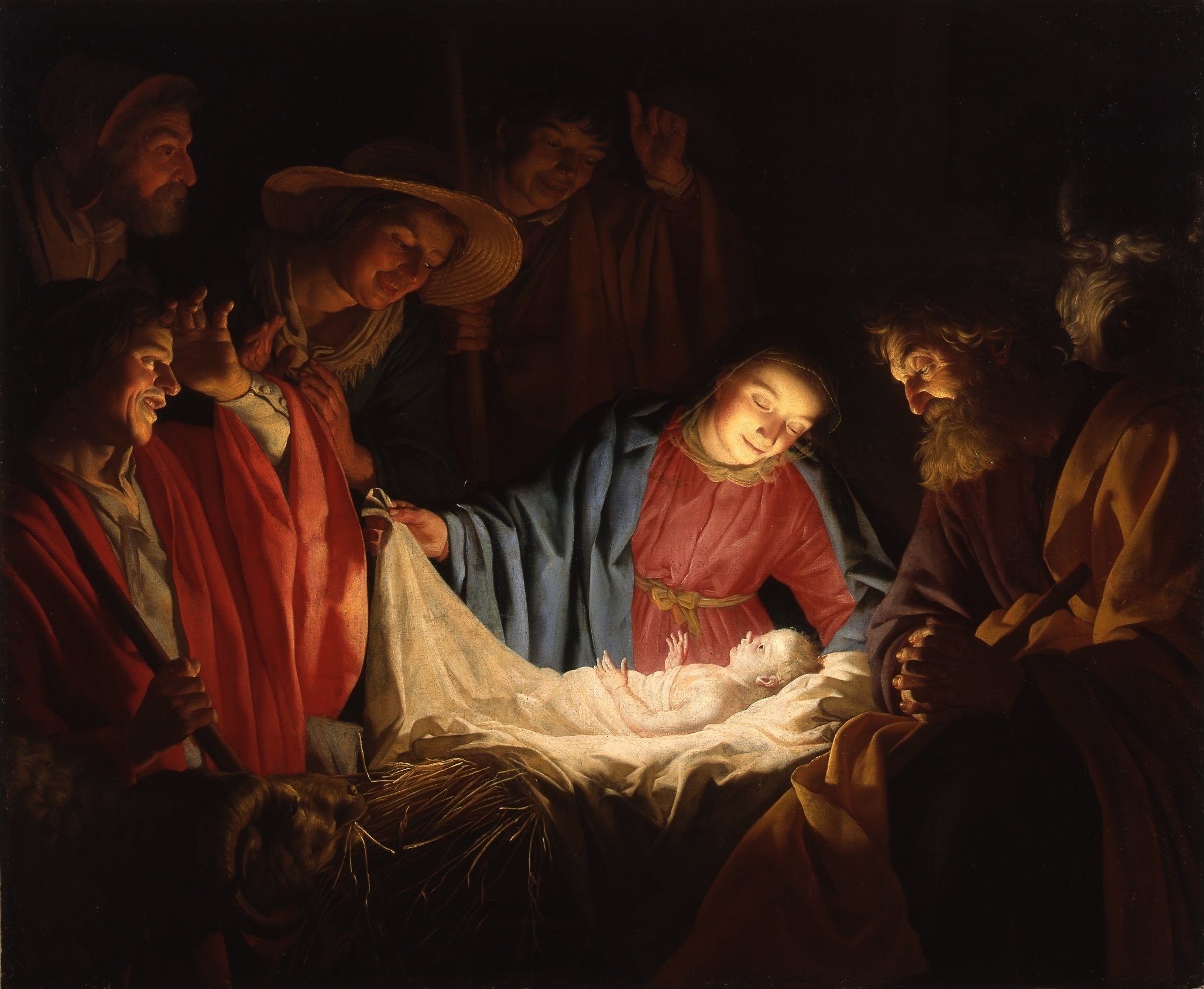
Gerard van Honthorst, 1622

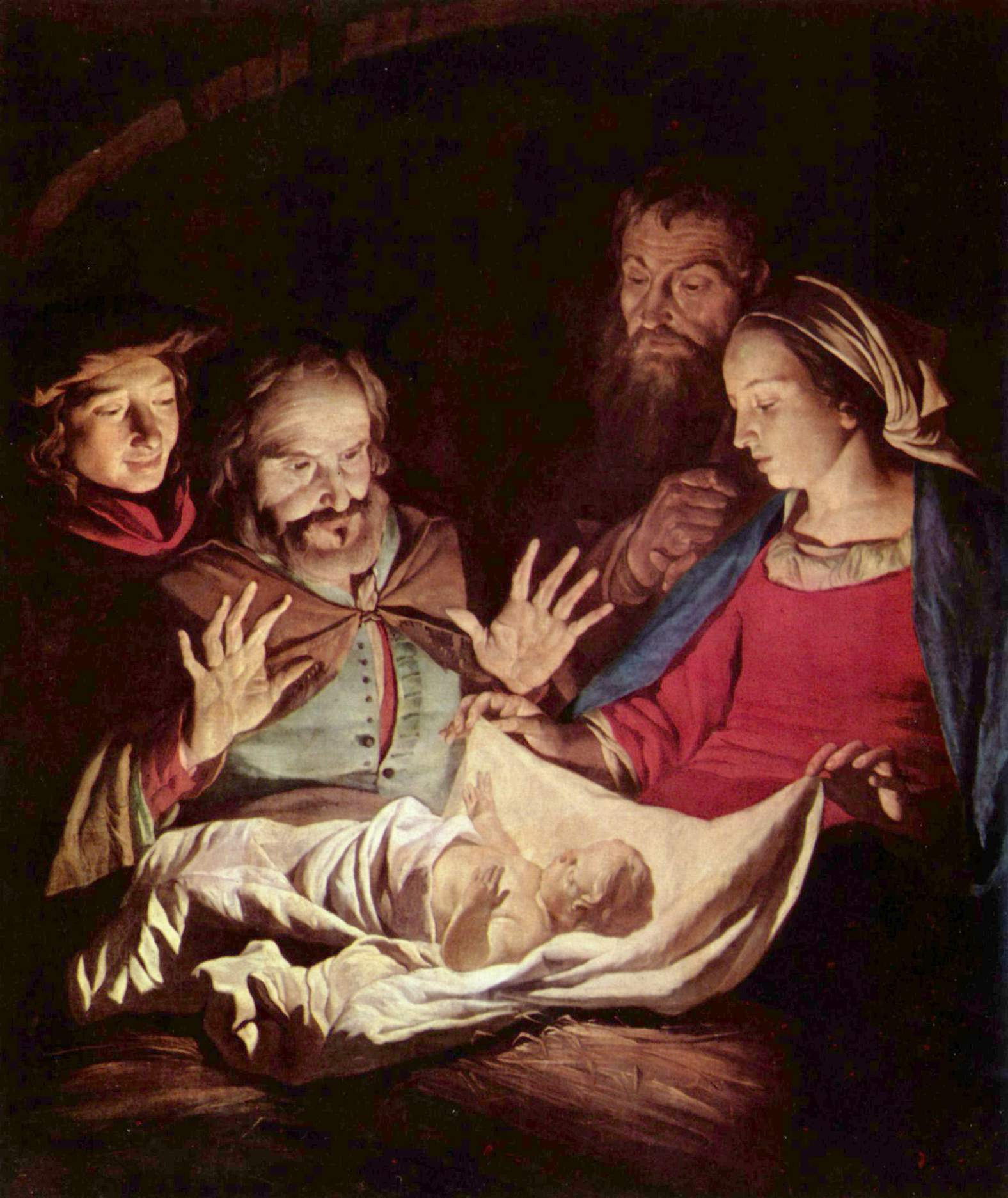
Matthias Stom, between 1625 and 1650

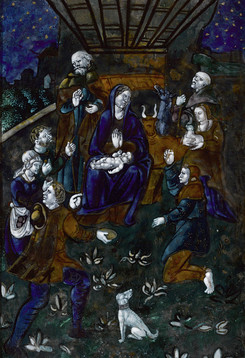
French Limoges enamel plaque, mid-16th century

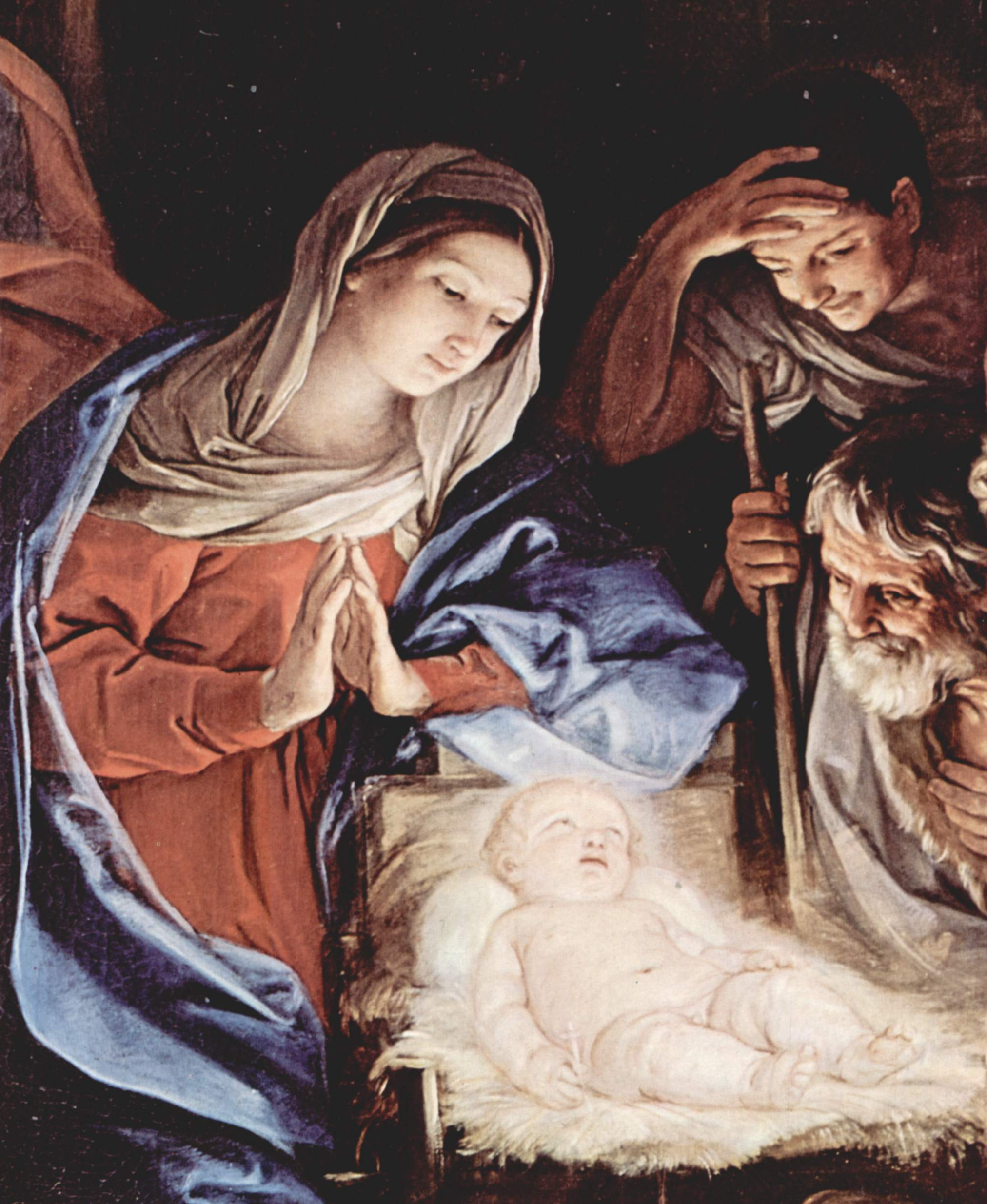
Guido Reni, 1630–1642

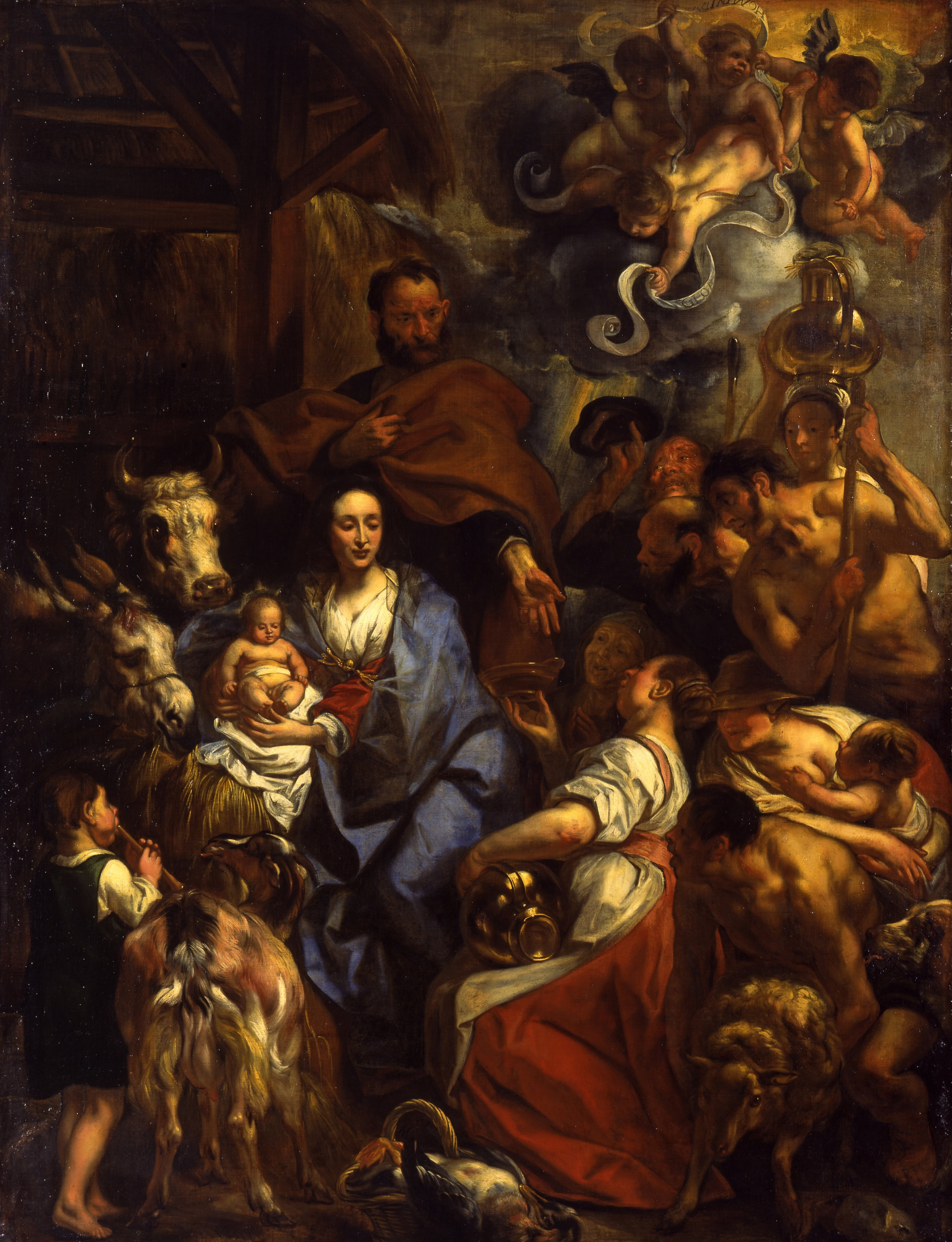
Jacob Jordaens, 1657

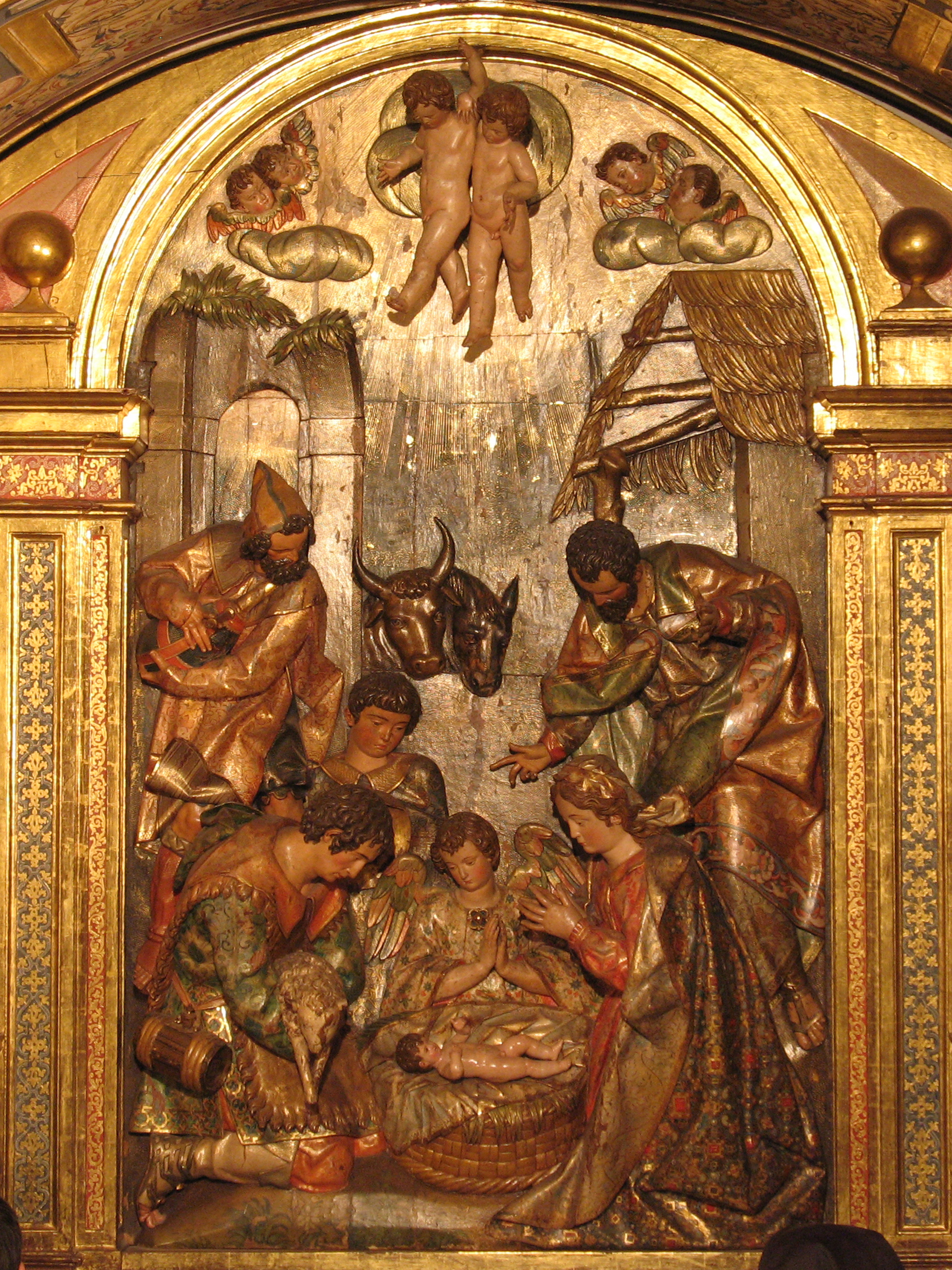
Gregorio Fernández, c. 1614

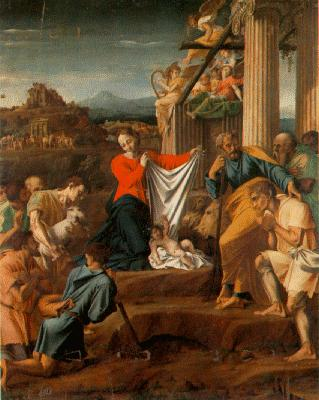
Polidoro da Caravaggio, 16th century

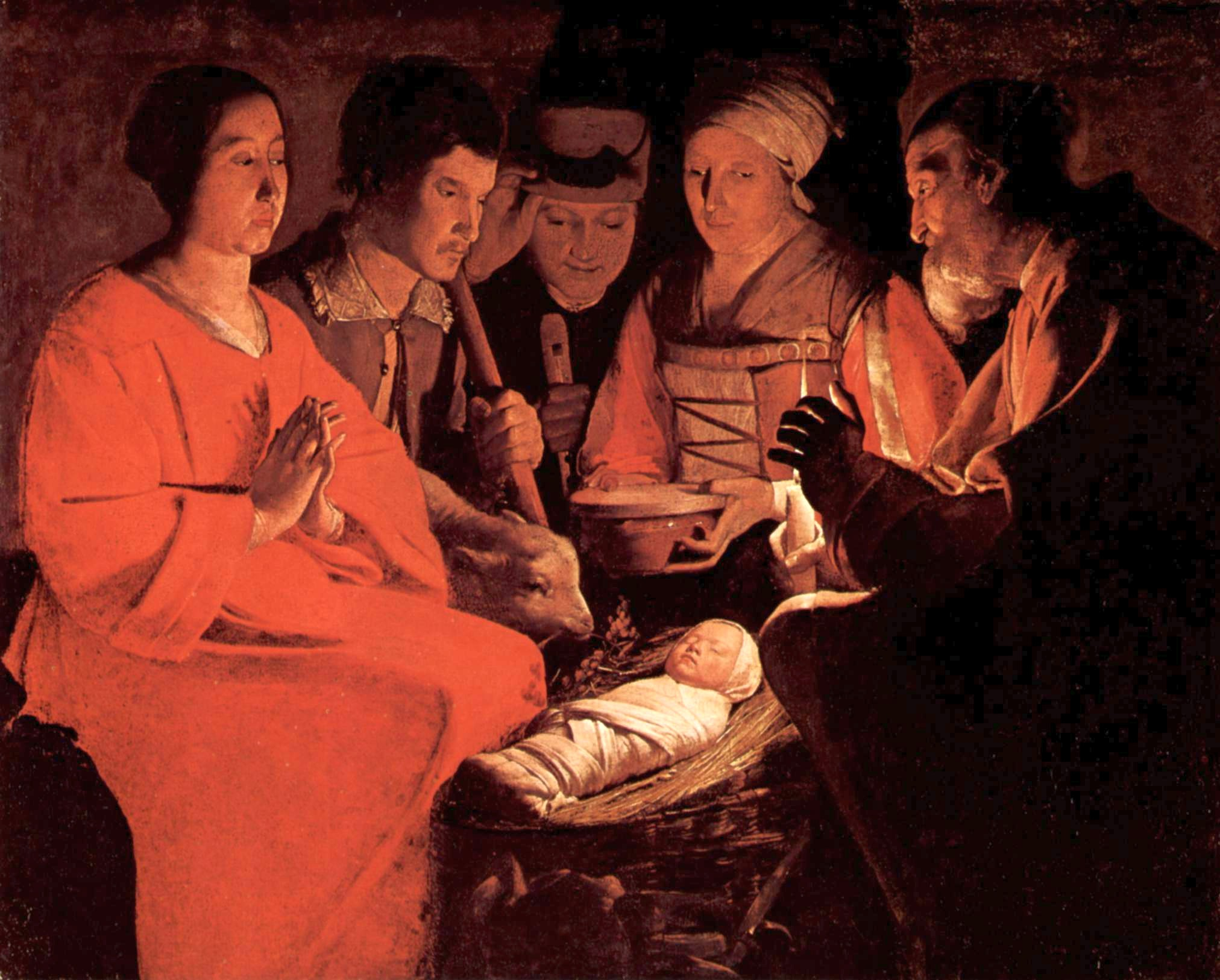
Georges de La Tour c. 1644

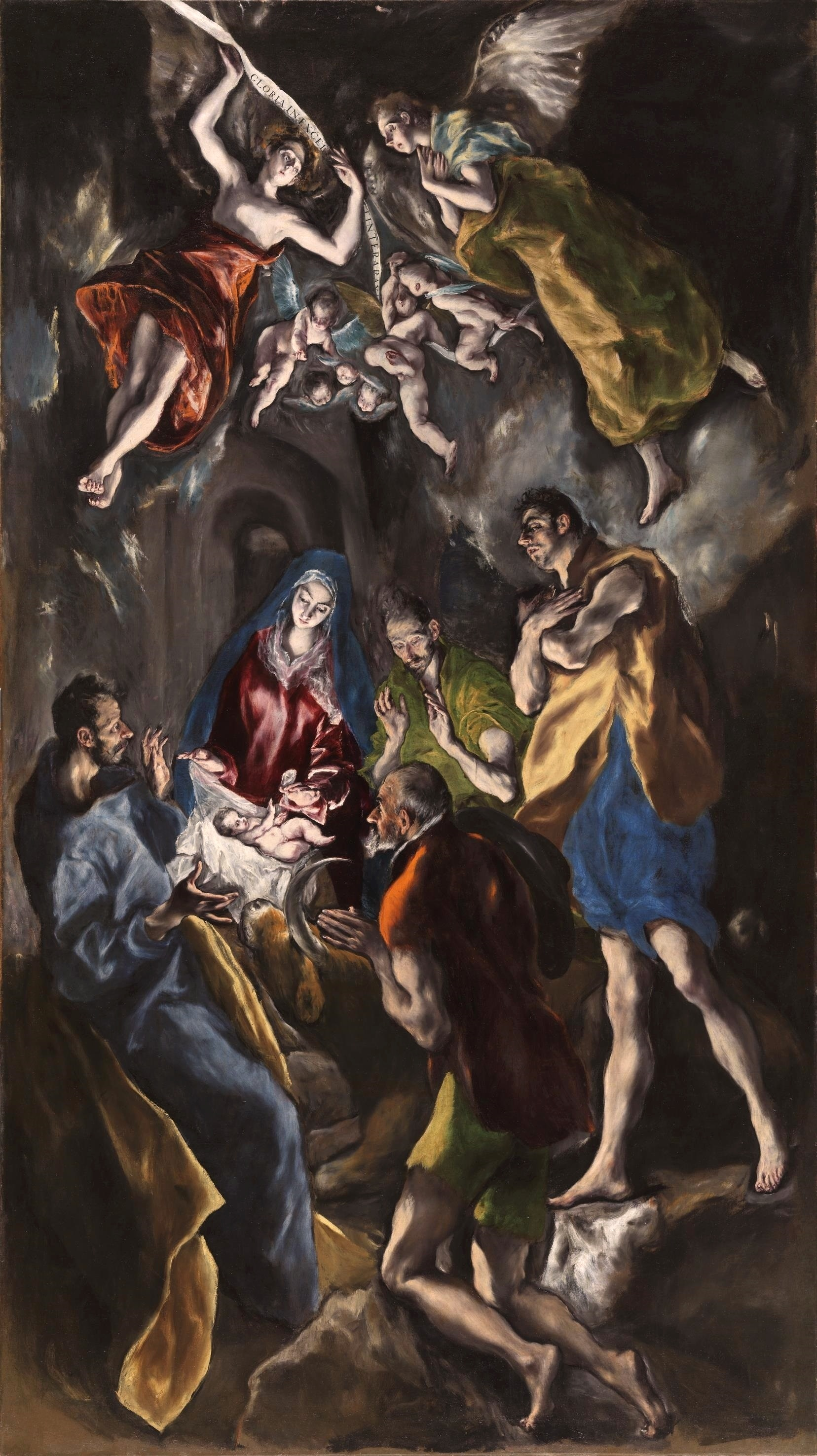
El Greco, 1614

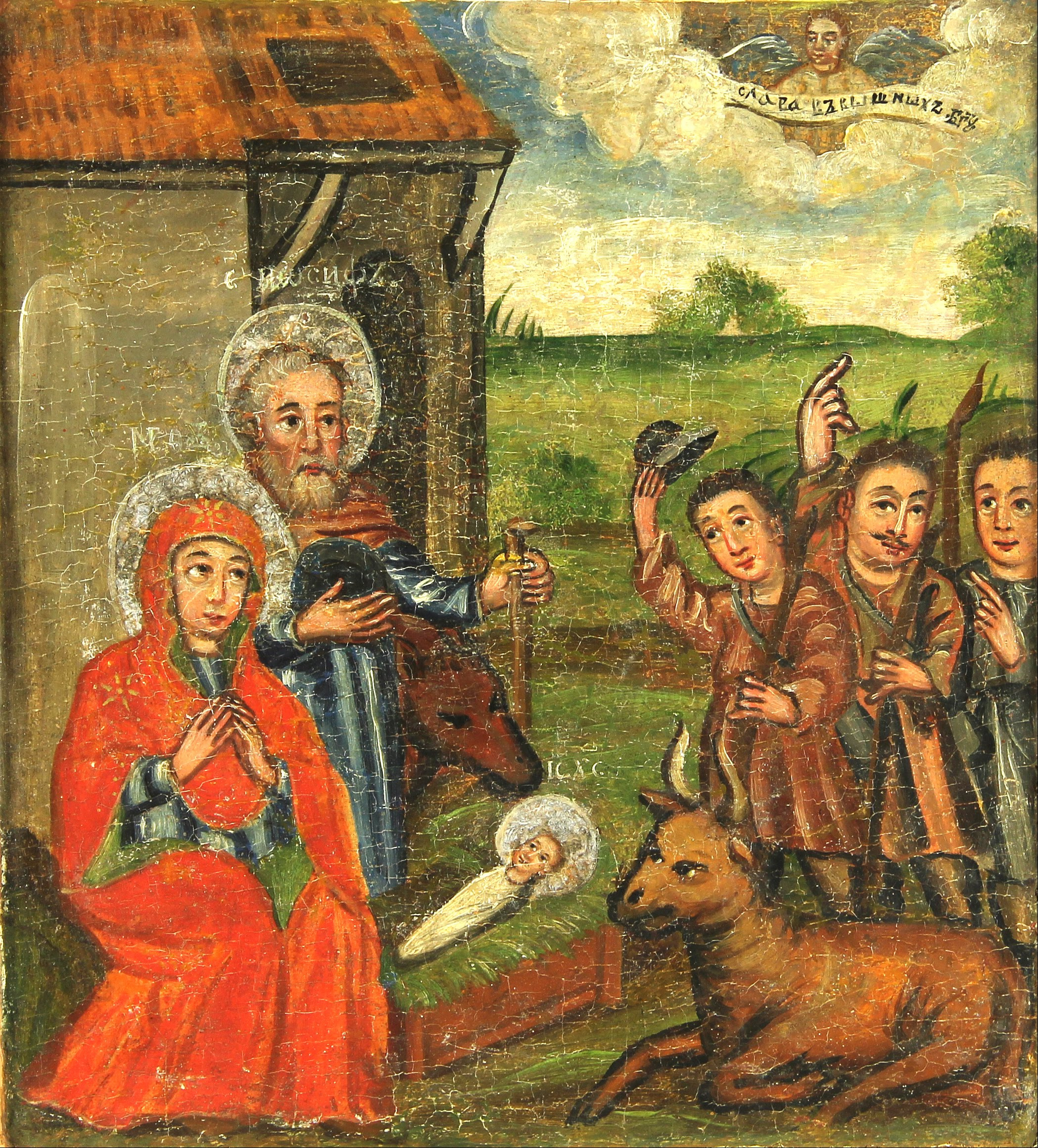
Ukrainian religious icon, late 17th century

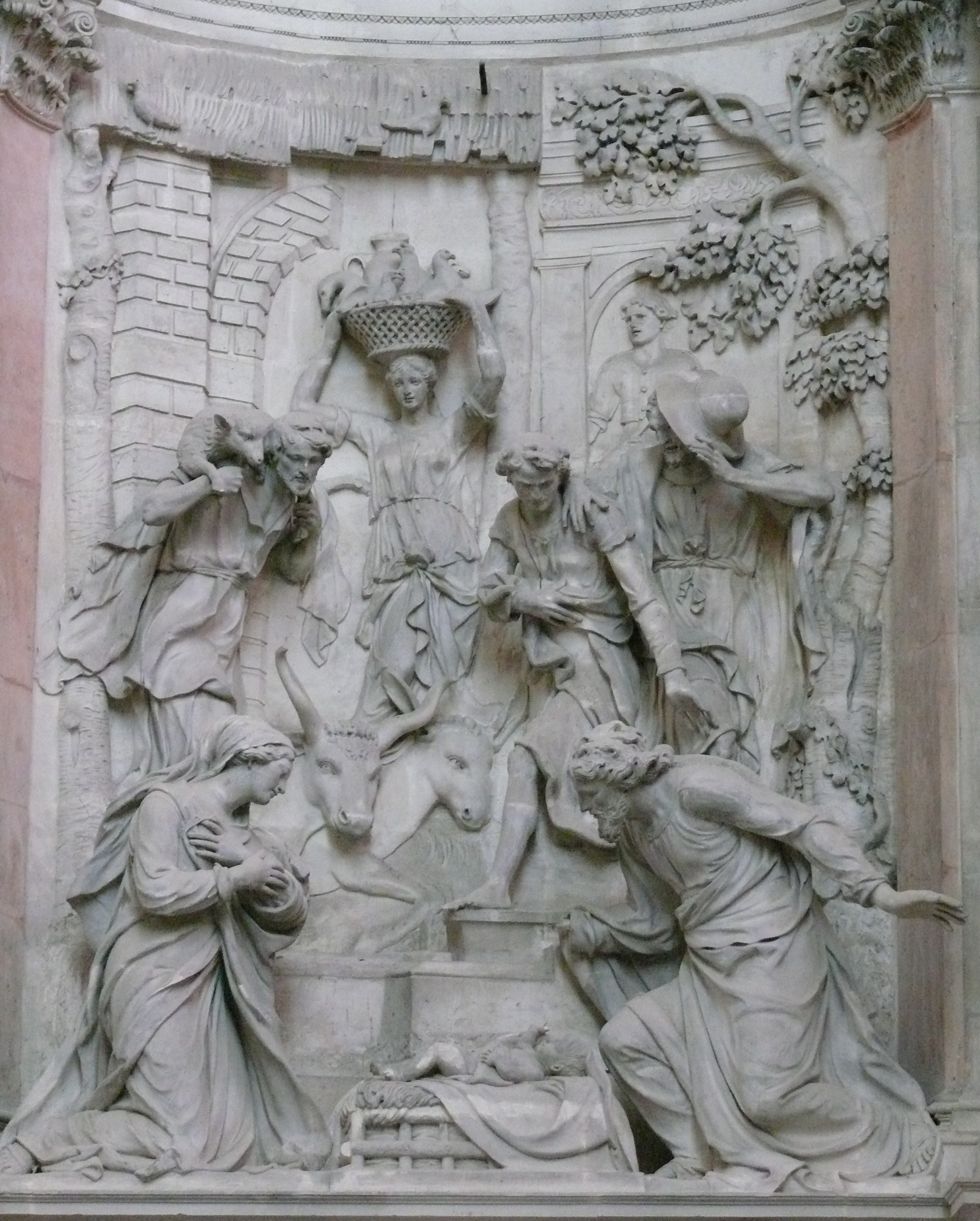
Ignace Robert c. 1691, Toul Cathedral

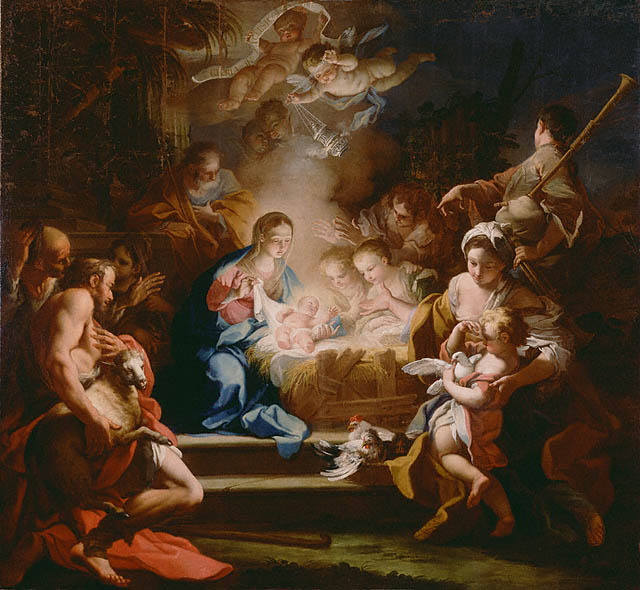
Sebastiano Conca c. 1720

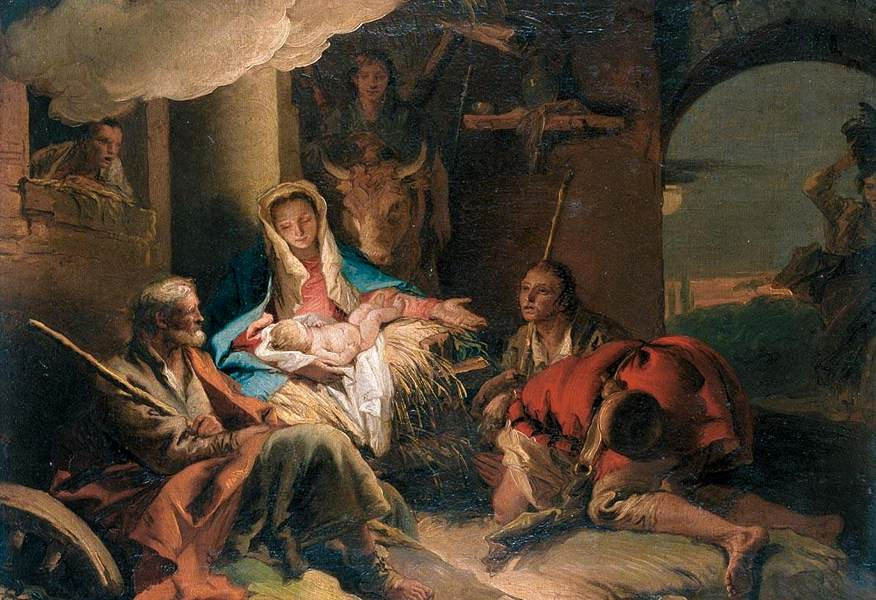
Giovanni Domenico Tiepolo, c. 1751–1753

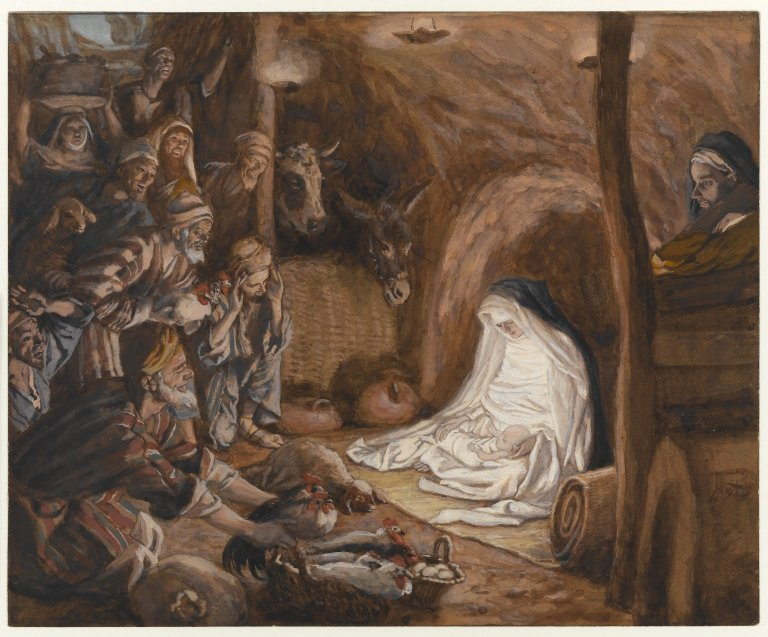
James Tissot, 1886–1894

== See also ==
- Adoration of the Magi
- Marian art in the Catholic Church
- Nativity of Jesus in art

== Bibliography ==
- Beckwith, John (1969). Early Medieval Art. Thames and Hudson. ISBN 0-500-20019-X.
- Edwards, James R. (2015). The Gospel of Luke. Eerdmans. ISBN 9780802837356.
- Levey, Michael (1961). From Giotto to Cézanne. Thames and Hudson. ISBN 0-500-20024-6.
- Myers, Bernard (1965, 1985). Landmarks of Western Art. Hamlyn. ISBN 0-600-35840-2.

Adoration of the Shepherds Life of Jesus
Preceded by Annunciation to the shepherds	New Testament; Events	Succeeded by Circumcision of Jesus
