= Adoration of the Shepherds (Mantegna) =

Painting by Andrea Mantegna

The Adoration of the Shepherds
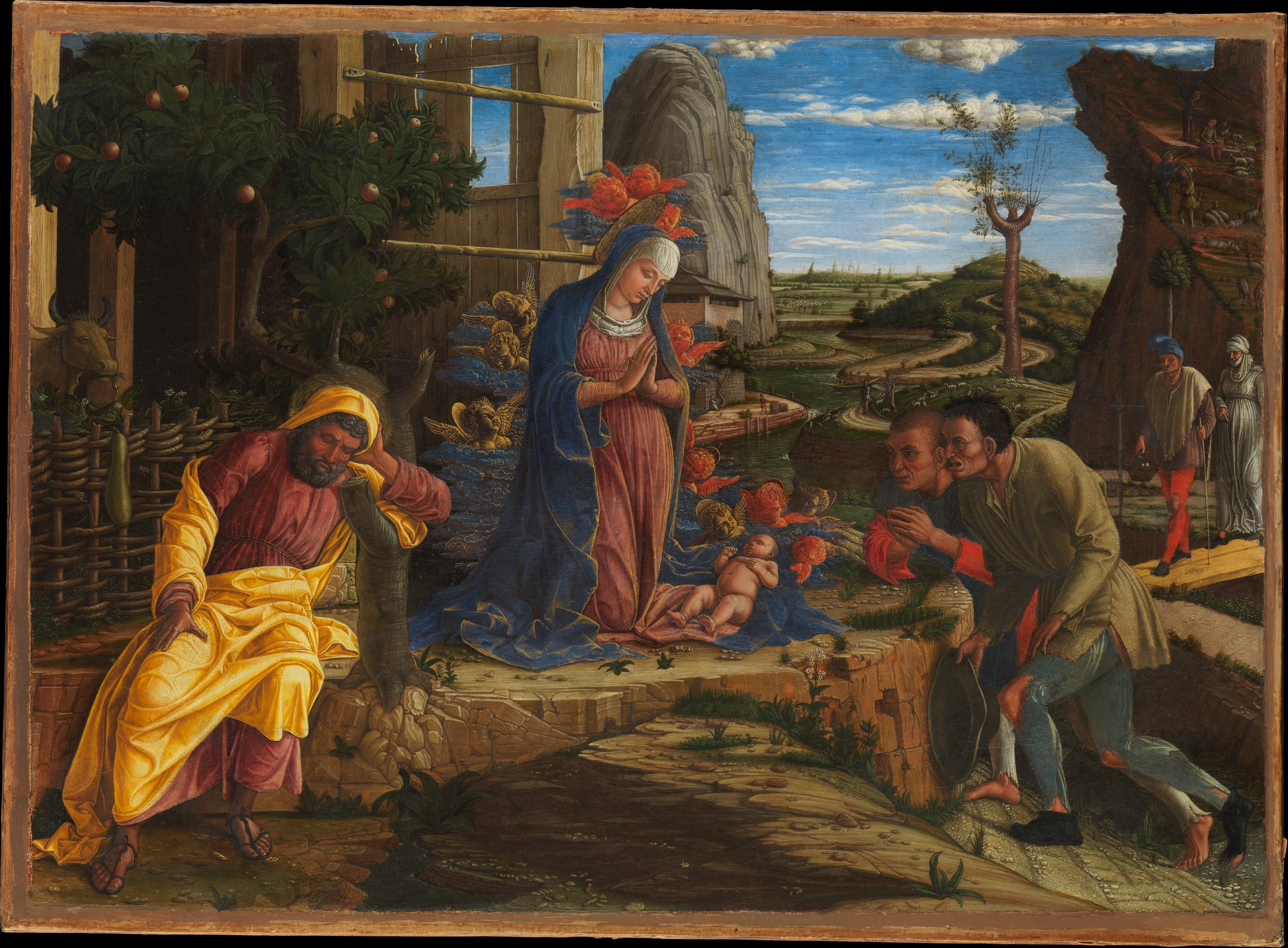
- Artist: Andrea Mantegna
- Year: 1450–1451
- Medium: Tempera on canvas
- Dimensions: 37.8 cm × 53.3 cm (14.9 in × 21.0 in)
- Location: Metropolitan Museum of Art; New York
- Website: The Met

The Adoration of the Shepherds is a painting by the northern Italian Renaissance artist Andrea Mantegna, dated to c. 1450-1451.

== History ==
This small painting is generally attributed to Mantegna's youth. It was likely commissioned by Borso d'Este during the artist's stay in Ferrara in 1450–1451.

The work, originally on panel, was subsequently moved to canvas at an unknown date, losing a small section on the far right. It is perhaps mentioned in a 1586 inventory of Margherita Gonzaga d'Este's possessions as a "Prosepio de Andrea Mantegna" ("Nativity Scene of Andrea Mantegna"). By 1603 it was owned by Cardinal Pietro Aldobrandini, who kept it in the Villa Aldobrandini, and then it passed to his descendants. Later it was inherited by the Pamphilj, and then by the Borghese. In 1792 it was sold to the painter-dealer Alexander Day, who took it to London. William Buchanan sold it to Richard Payne Knight at Downton Castle, Herefordshire; his eventual heirs sold it to Joseph Duveen. In 1925 it was acquired from Duveen, New York, by Clarence Mackay; it was purchased for the Metropolitan Museum of Art by an anonymous donor.

== Description ==
The scene is set in an open space, with the Madonna in the middle, adoring the Child while kneeling on a stony area within a crumbling wall, while to her right St. Joseph is sleeping, and to her left two shepherds pray. St. Joseph's sleep may hint at his role as mere guardian of the Virgin and the Child. The blasted tree on which he leans has born fruit on a single branch; the usual interpretation of this traditional feature is of the mystic renewal of Nature under the new dispensation. Jesus' three-quarters depiction is typical of Mantegna's production. Twelve cherubs, borne on a cloud, surround the Virgin and cradle the Child.

Behind the Virgin, to the left, are depicted boards of the ruinous stable in which Jesus was born, according to tradition. On the right is a wide landscape, framed by two steep mountains. Two other shepherds are represented in the right background, and a third on the road next to the river, each one met by an angel (bearing the news). A big tree somewhat resembling the Calvary Cross presages Jesus' Passion. There is also an ox, a traditional mute witness of the Nativity. Faint traces of the traditional ass may be glimpsed in the darkness within the stable doorway. The prominent gourd hanging on the wattle fence is a Christian symbol representing the Resurrection and also referring to pilgrimage.

Several flaws in the perspective have induced scholars to assign this work to a date near that of the first frescoes executed by Mantegna in the Ovetari Chapel, in particular to the first scenes of the Life of St. James (1448-1450). The attention to detail has been explained by the influence of the Flemish School, which Mantegna could study in the Este family collection, perhaps through a direct knowledge of Rogier van der Weyden. The grotesque portraits of the shepherds, such as their wrinkles and other realistic details, show the influence of northern European examples.
