= Adoration of the Shepherds (Murillo, London) =

Painting by Bartolomé Esteban Murillo

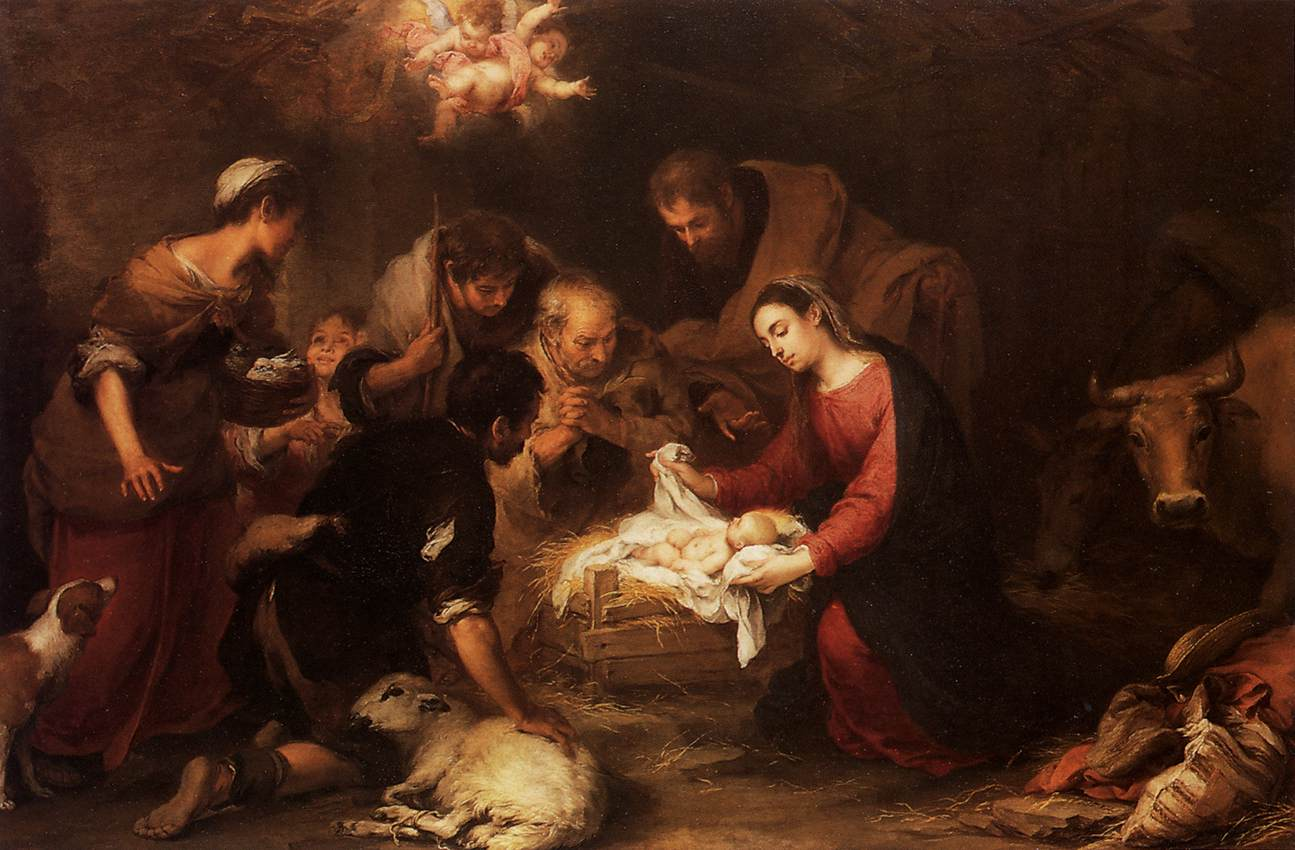
Adoration of the Shepherds (c. 1668) by Bartolomé Esteban Murillo

Adoration of the Shepherds is a c. 1668 oil on canvas painting by Bartolomé Esteban Murillo, his second surviving work on that subject after a c.1650 version. It is held at the Wallace Collection, in London.
