= Adoration of the Shepherds (Domenichino) =

Painting by Domenichino

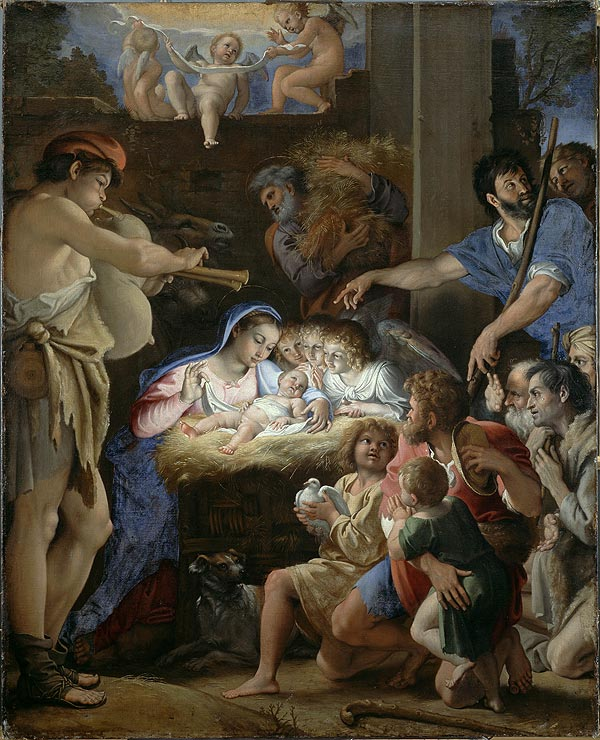
- Artist: Domenichino
- Year: c. 1607-1610
- Medium: Oil on canvas
- Dimensions: 143 cm × 115 cm (56 in × 45 in)
- Location: National Gallery of Scotland, Edinburgh

The Adoration of the Shepherds is an oil-on-canvas painting by the Italian master Domenichino, executed c. 1607–1610. It has been in the National Gallery of Scotland in Edinburgh since 1971, and was previously in the Dulwich Picture Gallery in London.

== Description ==
The painting shows a fairly conventional depiction of this very common scene, with some unusual details. The number of shepherds is rather large at nine, and the pose of the shepherd pointing at the baby Jesus while looking over his shoulder outside the picture space suggests that more are arriving. Or possibly he has seen the approaching Magi, the next arrivals in the traditional narrative. Saint Joseph, often a rather superfluous figure in paintings of the Nativity, is shown making himself useful by carrying hay, presumably to feed the ox and ass, in the background, so filling a gap in the composition, and perhaps distracting them from joining in with the bagpipe music. The relegation of the ox and ass to a dimly-lit background is typical of 17th century compositions.

A prominently placed shepherd on the left side of the group is shown playing his bagpipes. Though the shepherds sometimes carry musical instruments, often including pipes (see gallery below), they are less often shown playing them at this solemn moment, as opposed to the earlier scene of the Annunciation to the Shepherds where an angel appears to them with their flocks. If music is shown being performed beside the crib it is more often by angels. A charming but atypical miniature in the 15th-century Flemish La Flora Hours in Naples shows a shepherd playing his bagpipes as his two companions dance for the infant Jesus and a delighted Virgin Mary sits to one side. Outside his painting, Domeninchino had a serious interest in musical instruments and their design, which his paintings sometimes reflect. He designed and himself constructed instruments intended to be suitable for playing ancient music.

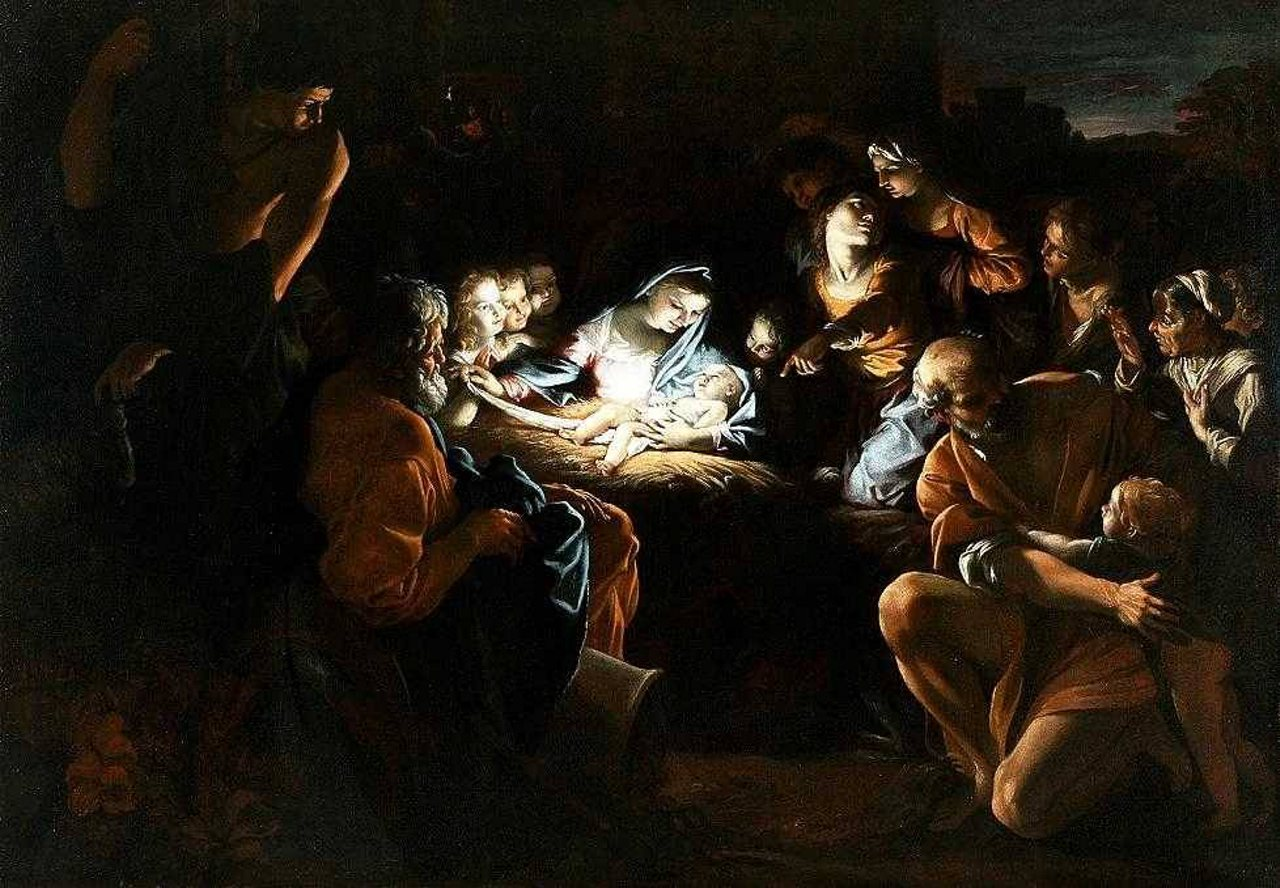
The Giovanni Lanfranco Adoration at Alnwick Castle, 1607–08

The inclusion of the shepherd's dog, especially right by the crib, is unusual, though the shepherds very often have one in scenes of their annunciation, and sometimes bring a lamb to the crib as a gift; here the dove held by the boy in the foreground is intended to represent a gift. In the 17th century the shepherds often crowd round the crib, as here, and Mary actively displays her child to them. However her gesture of lifting a cloth, revealing a full view of a naked Jesus, including his penis, is unusual in art by this date. In the late medieval period pictures of the infant Jesus often made a point of displaying his genitals for theological reasons, but in the Counter-Reformation this was discouraged by clerical interpreters of the vague decrees on art of the Council of Trent, such as Saint Charles Borromeo.

== Carracci model ==
The 17th-century art historian Gian Pietro Bellori makes the first mention of this work and describes it as a copy of a lost work by Annibale Carracci. Domenichino had been trained in Bologna by Annibale's brother Ludovico Carracci, and after moving to Rome in 1602 joined the circle of Annibale, who had already made the move there around the time Domenichino began to work with Ludovico. At this relatively early period in his career Domenichino copied several works by Annibale, and Bellori's statement has been generally accepted. However it seems that Bellori probably never saw the Carracci original, and no certain documentation for its subsequent history has been found. There is evidence bearing on the development of the composition in the form of a number of drawings by both Annibale and Domenichino, and two paintings by Giovanni Lanfranco, another young artist in the circle, that are based on the lost Carracci (one known only from a further copy).

There has been a good deal of academic discussion on the matter, without a clear consensus being found as to how close Domenichino's composition is to the lost Carracci. The main Lanfranco, now at Alnwick Castle, is clearly related to the Domenichino, but has substantial differences, being in a horizontal format and with none of the poses of the figures exactly the same, and several substantially different. The possibility remains that Bellori was "slightly mistaken" and that the phantom Carracci Adoration was never painted and that Domenichino was only working from drawings by Carracci, who painted little after a serious illness in 1605, but did produce an etching of this subject in about 1606.

Most of the large collection of workshop drawings left by Domenichino passed through the Albani Collection before ending up in the British Royal Collection, bought for George III; there are over 1,750 sheets at Windsor Castle today. These include a sheet with studies of the Edinburgh figures of Joseph on one side and the bagpiper on the other. Drawings can be regarded by different scholars as either copies of something already existing, sketches where an artist works out something new, or adaptations that are something in between, and this ambiguity has affected discussion of this question. Hugh Brigstocke, in the National Gallery of Scotland catalogue, sees this sheet as studies by Domenichino for new figures for his version of Carracci's composition, after Domenichino decided to add the bagpiper to strengthen the composition, necessitating a new position for Joseph. Other details, such as the boy with the dove, borrow from other drawings by Annibale Carracci.

== History ==
The history of the painting before 1813 is unclear, and complicated by possible confusion with the lost model by Annibale Carracci. There is an engraving of the painting, described as being by Domenichino, which however omits certain details, suggesting it was made from a preparatory drawing also lacking these. Domenichino is mentioned by Bellori and described as a copy of a Carracci, which Bellori probably had never seen and did not know the whereabouts of. Bellori, in his book of artists' biographies published in 1672, said the Domenichino had recently left Rome for France. A Nativity attributed to Annibale Carracci, which might be either the original or the copy, is recorded by André Félibien as being in the large collection of Jean-Baptiste Colbert (1619–83), the famous finance minister of Louis XIV. According to Pierre-Jean Mariette the picture in the engraving belonged to the Orleans Collection, although it does not seem to appear in any of the inventories. This collection had received a significant addition from Colbert's heir Jean-Baptiste Colbert, Marquis de Seignelay. Most of the paintings of the Orleans Collection were taken to London and dispersed during the French Revolution, but again this painting is not identifiable among the records of the sales and other transactions recording this process.

The painting's history is certain after it appears in a list of 1813 of the paintings bequeathed to the College of God's Gift, the charity owning Dulwich College, a school in the London suburbs, by Sir Francis Bourgeois in 1811. It was described as by Annibale Carracci here, and only finally confirmed as a Domenichino in 1906–7 by Hans Tietze, an attribution since accepted by all writers. The Dulwich Picture Gallery was founded to hold the Bourgeois bequest and other artworks owned by the charity, and the painting hung there until it was controversially sold by the trustees in 1971. It was sold at auction for £100,000 by Sotheby's London on 24 March 1971, and bought by the National Gallery of Scotland. The sale was the subject of an adjournment debate in the House of Commons on 13 May 1971, where both the trustees and the minister whose consent had been necessary for the sale to occur were criticised by George Strauss M.P., especially for only publicising the sale three weeks before the auction. For a month over Christmas and New Year 2011/12 the painting returned to Dulwich as part of the celebrations for the gallery's bicentenary.

The picture is in good condition, but the blues in the robes of the Virgin and the shepherd standing at right, as well as the yellow of the boy holding the dove, have "been affected by chemical change".

== Gallery ==
A number of paintings from the 1530s and 1540s show a shepherd with bagpipes inflated, and the chanter pipe being fingered, but the mouthpiece not actually being blown.

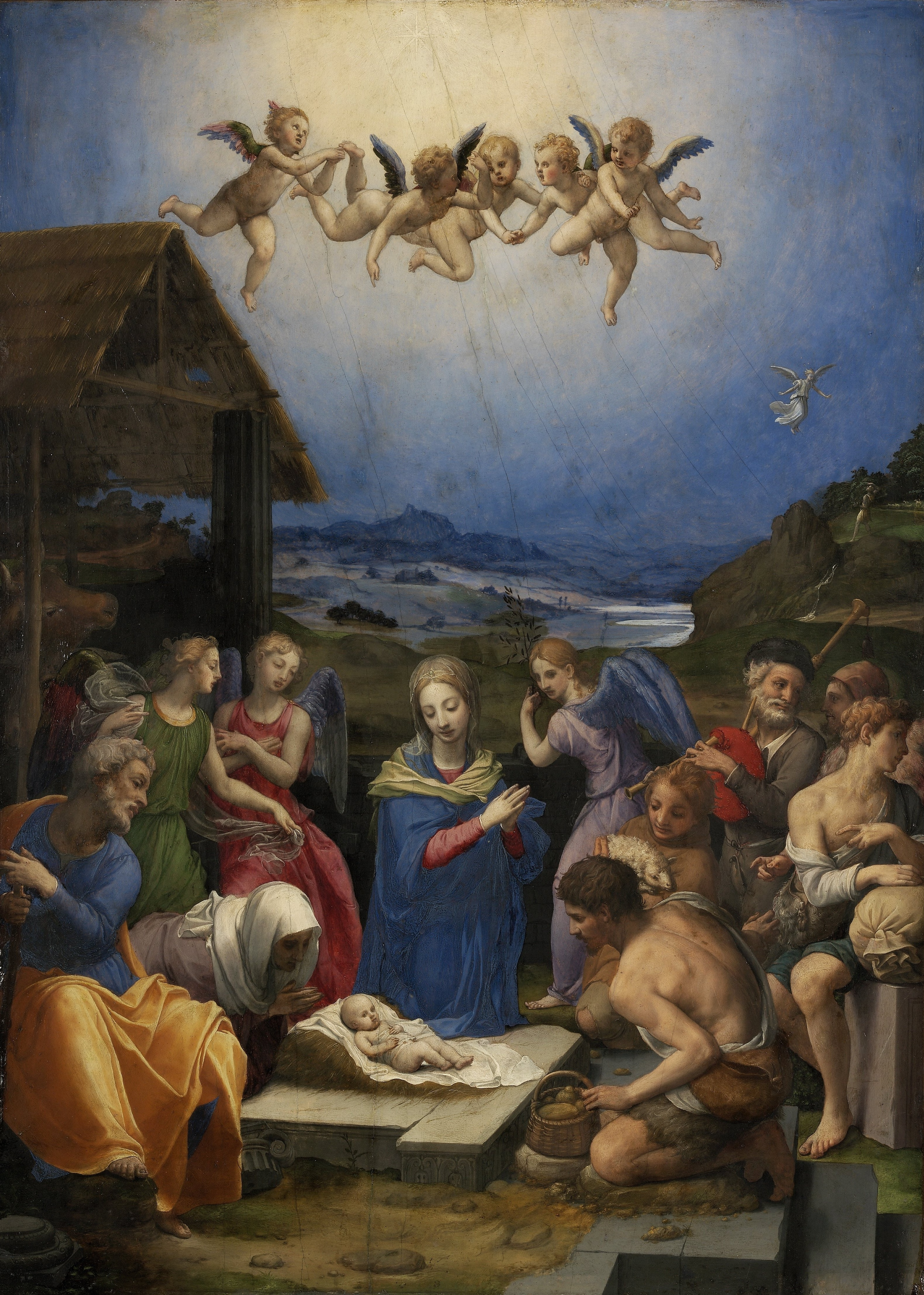
Angelo Bronzino, 1539–40

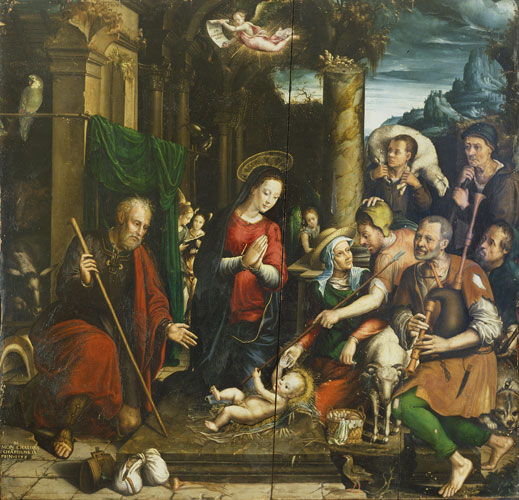
Simon de Châlons, 1548

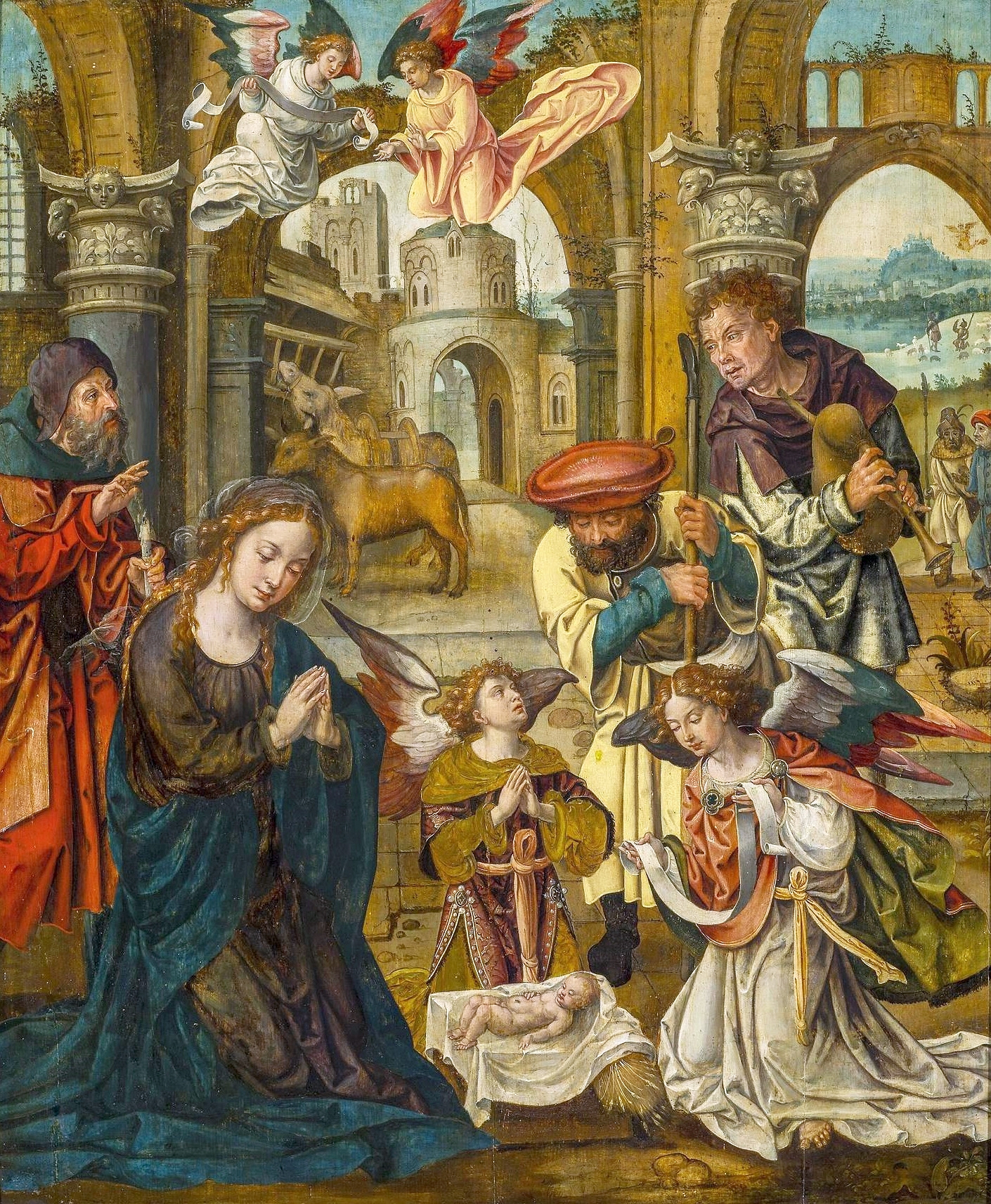
Pieter Coecke van Aelst, 1540s
