= Adoration of the Shepherds (Reni) =

Painting by Guido Reni

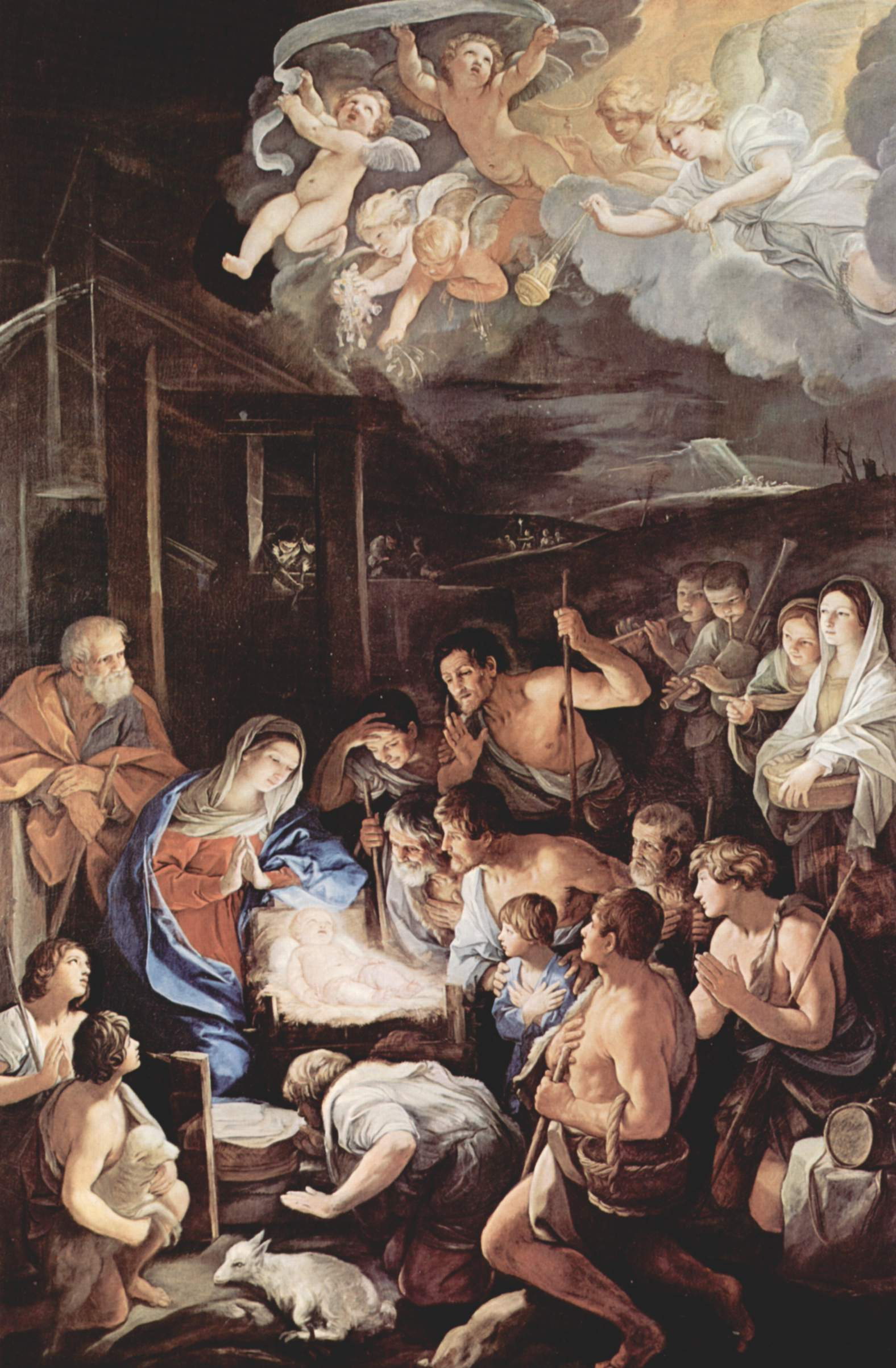
Adoration of the Shepherds (c. 1642) by Guido Reni

Adoration of the Shepherds is a c. 1642 oil on canvas painting by Guido Reni, commissioned by Giovan Battista Pisante, prior of the Certosa di San Martino in Naples, and still hanging on the main wall of the choir of that institution's church.

== History ==
The commission was part of the prior's aim to refurbish the whole interior of the complex in the early decades of the 17th century. It was probably agreed in the late 1630s, though it was only placed on the choir wall in 1642, since upon Reni's death on 18 August that year his heirs only sent the completed work later. It has a particularly elaborate frame, with the side walls featuring two pairs of paintings - the 1589 Last Supper by Paolo Veronese and his studio paired with Massimo Stanzione's 1639 Passover of the Hebrews on the right hand wall and Battistello Caracciolo's 1622 Christ Washing the Disciples' Feet and Jusepe de Ribera's 1651 Communion of the Apostles on the left hand wall.

Right from its completion onwards the fathers of the Certosa highly valued the work, as can be seen by the fact that - when Reni's heirs argued that the colouring was incomplete and attempted to reacquire it - they failed. Early art history considers the work to be incomplete, but other completed autograph Reni works show similar colour drafting and so the work is now thought to be wholly autograph. In his writings Carlo Cesare Malvasia mentioned various other compositions on the same subject produced by Reni around the same time, including a c.1640 one now at the National Gallery, London similar to the Naples work, albeit slightly smaller and with small variations.
