= Adoration of the Shepherds (Lorenzo di Credi) =

Painting by Lorenzo di Credi

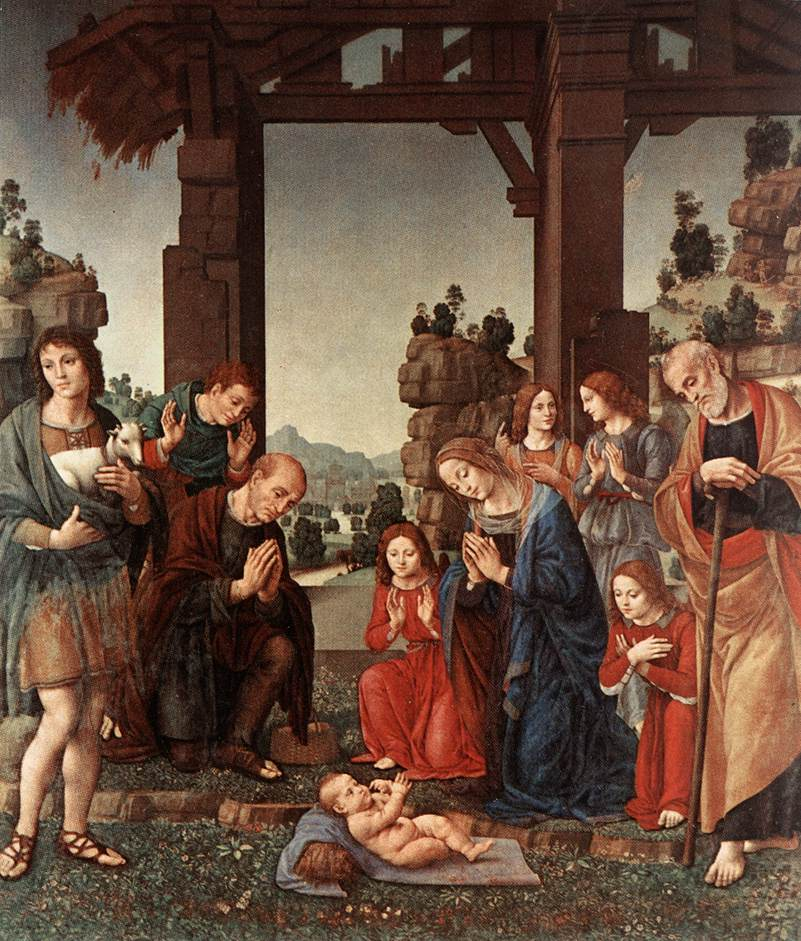
- Artist: Lorenzo di Credi
- Year: c. 1510
- Medium: Oil on panel
- Dimensions: 224 cm × 196 cm (88 in × 77 in)
- Location: Uffizi Gallery; Florence

The Adoration of the Shepherds is a painting by the Italian Renaissance painter Lorenzo di Credi, dating to about 1510. It is displayed in the Uffizi Gallery of Florence.

== History ==
The painting, commissioned by the nuns of Santa Chiara in Florence, is mentioned by the contemporary painter Mariotto Albertinelli and by the art biographer Giorgio Vasari, as well as in Florence's art guides from the late 17th century.

There are several preparatory studies, now at the Albertina of Vienna, the Cabinet des Dessins of Paris (the figure of St. Joseph) and the Gabinetto dei disegni e delle stampe at the Uffizi (for the lamb held by a shepherd).

== Description ==
Under a ruined hut (a symbol of the declining pagan and Hebraic religions, is depicted the adoration of Jesus, who lies on a veil over a pile of straw; Jesus' features are similar to those used in some of Verrocchio's works. On the left, in a semicircle, are a shepherd with a lamb (symbol of Christ's sacrifice) looking on the left (inspired by Perugino), two praying shepherds inspired by the Portinari Triptych and perhaps Domenico Ghirlandaio, the Virgin, two standing and one kneeling angels with red clothes, and a standing St. Joseph, also inspired by Perugino. The Virgin and the angels are instead similar to features used by Leonardo da Vinci in works such as the Virgin of the Rocks.
