= Adoration of the Shepherds (Murillo, Madrid) =

Painting by Bartolomé Esteban Murillo

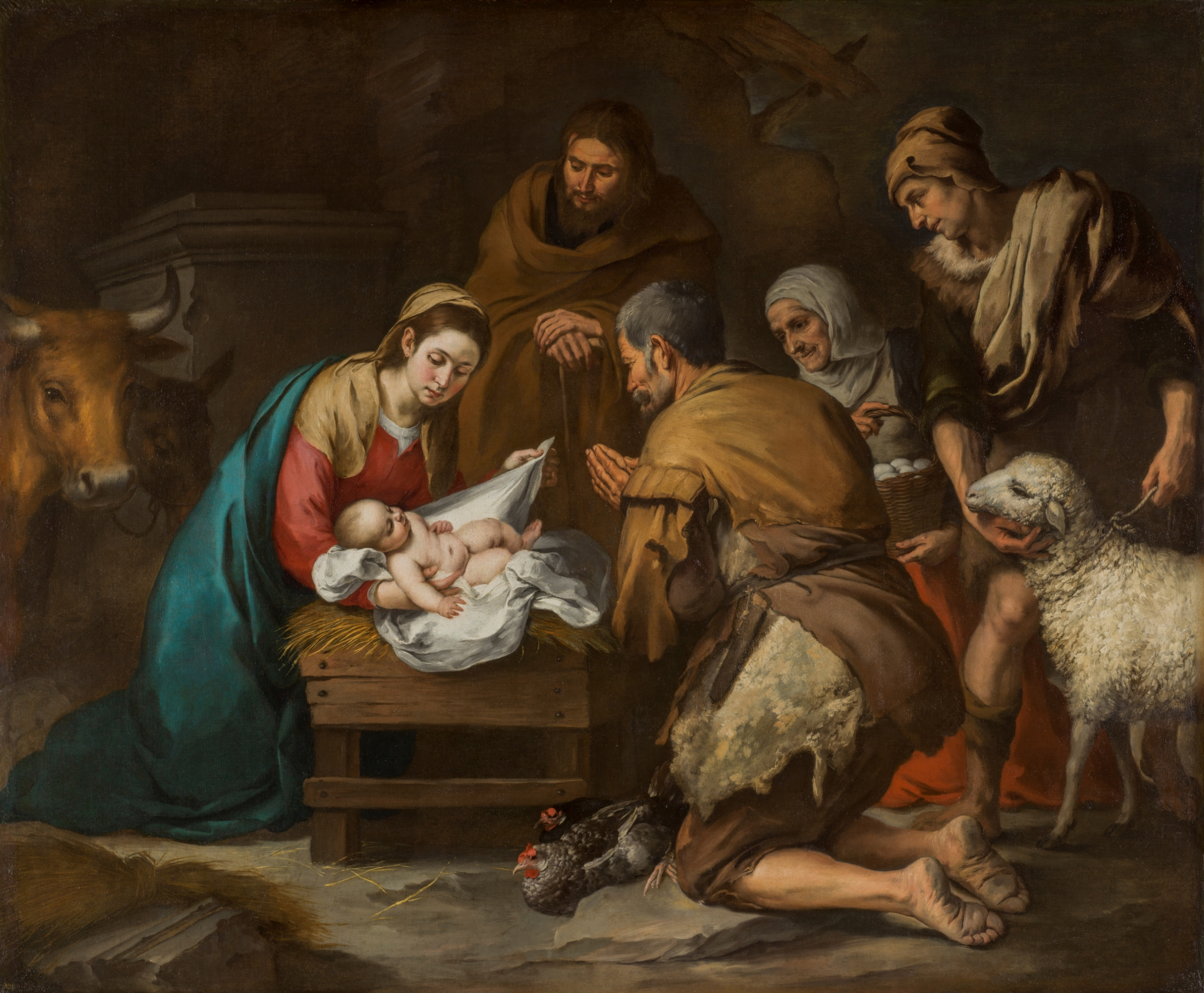
- Artist: Bartolomé Esteban Murillo
- Year: c. 1650
- Medium: Oil on canvas
- Dimensions: 187 cm × 228 cm (74 in × 90 in)
- Location: Museo del Prado, Madrid

The Adoration of the Shepherds is a painting in oils on canvas by Bartolomé Esteban Murillo in the Museo del Prado in Madrid, dating to c. 1650. He also produced a later version of the same subject.
