= Adoration of the Shepherds (disambiguation) =

The Adoration of the Shepherds is the usual title in art for the scene in which shepherds are near witnesses to the birth of Jesus in Bethlehem.

Adoration of the Shepherds may refer to these specific works, among thousands of others:

- Adoration of the Shepherds (Caravaggio)
- Adoration of the Shepherds (Cariani)
- Adoration of the Shepherds (Correggio)
- Adoration of the Shepherds (Lucas Cranach the Elder)
- Adoration of the Shepherds (David)
- Adoration of the Shepherds (Domenichino)
- Adoration of the Shepherds (El Greco, Madrid)
- Adoration of the Shepherds (El Greco, Bucharest)
- Adoration of the Shepherds (El Greco, Valencis)
- Adoration of the Shepherds (El Greco, Rome)
- Adoration of the Shepherds (El Greco, New York)
- Adoration of the Shepherds (Giordano)
- Adoration of the Shepherds (Giorgione)
- Adoration of the Shepherds (der Goes)
- Adoration of the Shepherds (Le Nain)
- Adoration of the Shepherds (Lorenzo di Credi)
- Adoration of the Shepherds (Lotto)
- Adoration of the Shepherds (Mantegna)
- Adoration of the Shepherds (Josefa de Óbidos)
- Adoration of the Shepherds (Poussin)
- Adoration of the Shepherds (Raphael)
- Adoration of the Shepherds (Ribera, Castellammare di Stabia)
- Adoration of the Shepherds (Rubens)
- Adoration of the Shepherds (Santafede)
