= Josefa de Óbidos =

Spanish-born Portuguese painter

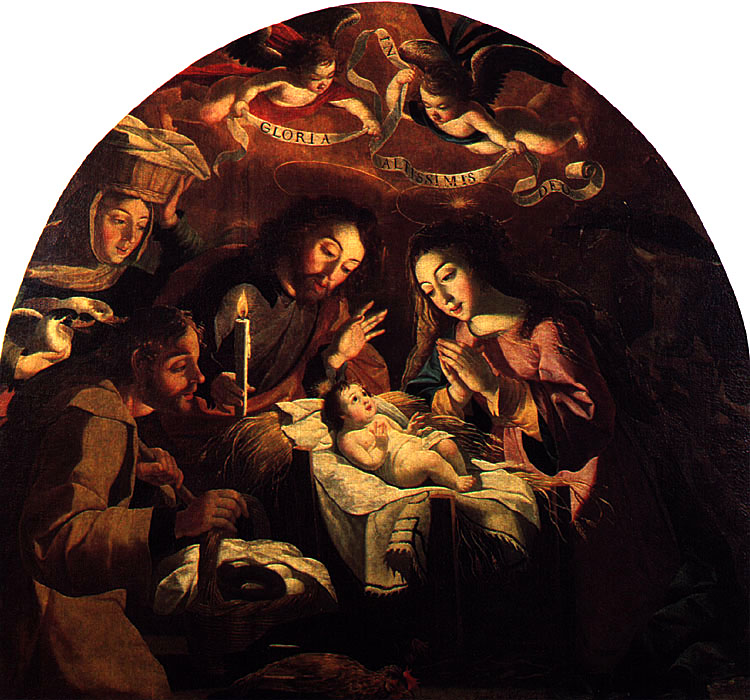
- Adoration of the Shepherds by Josefa de Óbidos, 1669, National Museum of Ancient Art, Lisbon
- Born: Josefa de Ayala Figueira c. 1630; Seville, Crown of Castile
- Died: 22 July 1684 (aged 54); Óbidos, Kingdom of Portugal
- Movement: Baroque

Signature
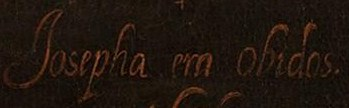

Josefa de Óbidos (Portuguese: [ʒuˈzɛfɐ ð(j) ˈɔβiðuʃ]; c. 1630 – 22 July 1684) was a Spanish-born Portuguese painter. Her birth name was Josefa de Ayala Figueira, but she signed her work as "Josefa em Óbidos" or "Josefa de Ayalla". All of her work was executed in Portugal, her father's native country, where she lived from the age of four. Approximately 150 works of art have been attributed to Josefa de Óbidos, making her one of the most prolific Baroque artists in Portugal.

== Biography ==
Josefa de Óbidos was baptized in Seville, Spain, on 20 February 1630; her godfather was the notable Sevillian painter Francisco de Herrera the Elder. Her father, Baltazar Gomes Figueira, was a Portuguese painter from the village of Óbidos. He went to Seville in the 1620s to improve his painting technique and, while there, married Catarina de Ayala y Cabrera, a native Andalusian, who would become the mother of Josefa. By 3 May 1634, the family is recorded living in Figueira's native Óbidos on the occasion of the baptism of their first son, Francisco.

In 1644, Josefa is documented as a boarder at the Augustinian Convent of Santa Ana in Coimbra, while her father was in nearby Santa Cruz, working on an altarpiece for the church of Nossa Senhora da Graça. While in residence at this convent in 1646, Josefa made engravings of St. Catherine and St. Peter, her earliest signed extant works. Josefa's first signed painting dates to 1647, a small Mystical Marriage of St. Catherine on copper (Museu Nacional de Arte Antiga, Lisbon), completed for the Augustinian Monastery of Santa Cruz in Coimbra. In the same year, she completed other small paintings on copper, including a Nativity Scene with St. Francis and Saint Clare Adoring the Newborn Christ (private collection).

Sometime before 1653, she and her family left Coimbra and settled in Óbidos, where she contributed an allegory of Wisdom to the Novos estatutos da Universidade de Coimbra, the book of rules for the University of Coimbra, whose frontispiece was being decorated by her father.

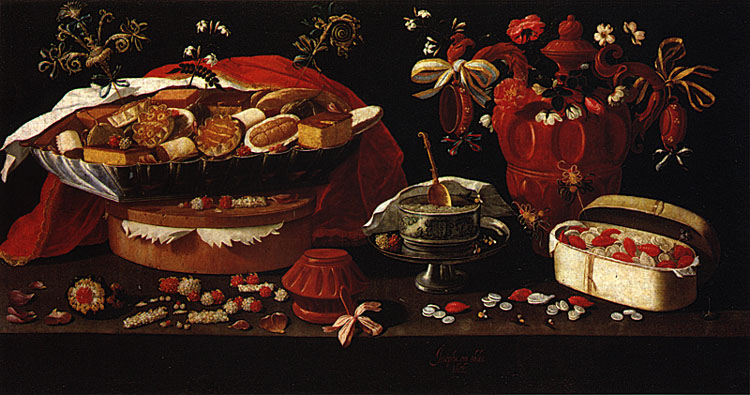
Still Life with Sweets and Pottery (c. 1679). Santarém, Municipal Library

During the decades that followed, Josefa executed several religious altarpieces for churches and convents in central Portugal, as well as paintings of portraits and still-life for private customers.

Josefa's will is dated 13 June 1684. In this document, the artist is described as having been "emancipated with the consent of her parents" and a "virgin who never married." She died on 22 July 1684 at the age of fifty-four, survived by her mother and two nieces (her father had died on 27 December 1674). She was buried in the Church of Saint Peter of Óbidos.

== Works ==
In the course of her career, Josefa de Óbidos received many important public commissions for altarpieces and other paintings to be displayed in churches and monasteries throughout central Portugal. Examples include the six canvases for the Saint Catherine altarpiece for the church of Santa Maria de Óbidos in 1661, six paintings representing Saint Theresa of Ávila (1672–1673) for the Carmelite Convent of Cascais, an Adoration of the Shepherds for the convent of Santa Madalena in Alcobaça (1669), and four paintings for the Casa de Misericórdia of Peniche (1679).

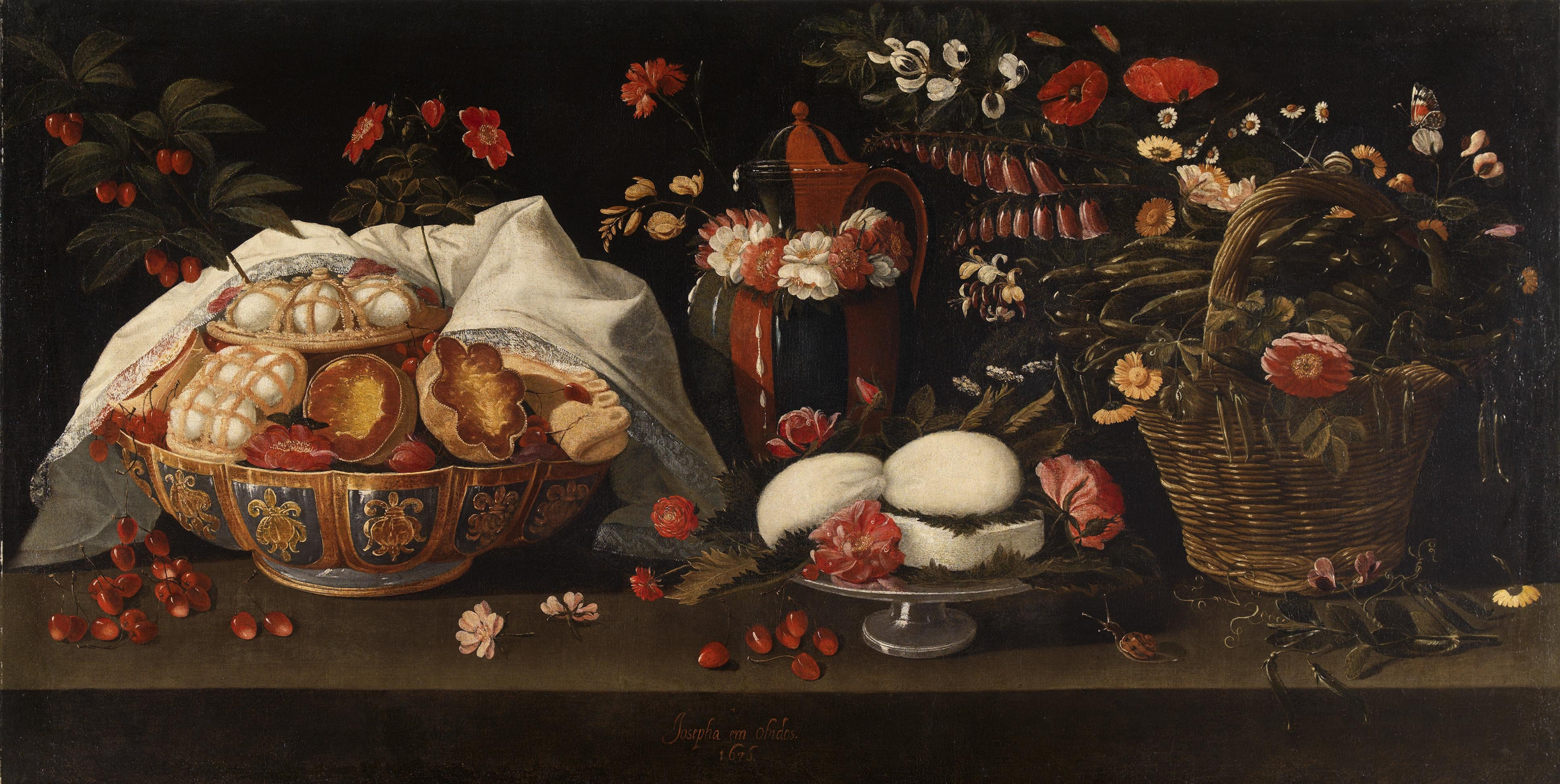
Still Life with Flowers and Sweets, 1676. Museu Municipal de Santarém.

Many of her still-life paintings, considered her specialty, are now preserved in the Museu Nacional de Arte Antiga in Lisbon. Among her most famous still lifes are a series of paintings of the months of the year, painted in collaboration with her father and now dispersed among various private collections; each of these paintings consists of a landscape background with a still life in the foreground, composed of the animals, fruits, and vegetables consumed in that month. While these paintings appear to be secular still-life paintings on the surface, they also have religious meaning and may be connected to Franciscan religiosity. An example of one of her religious paintings would be The Pascal Lamb which conveys ideas of piety and sacrifice. Taken as a whole, these paintings represent the passage of time, the inevitability of death, and the possibility of rebirth.

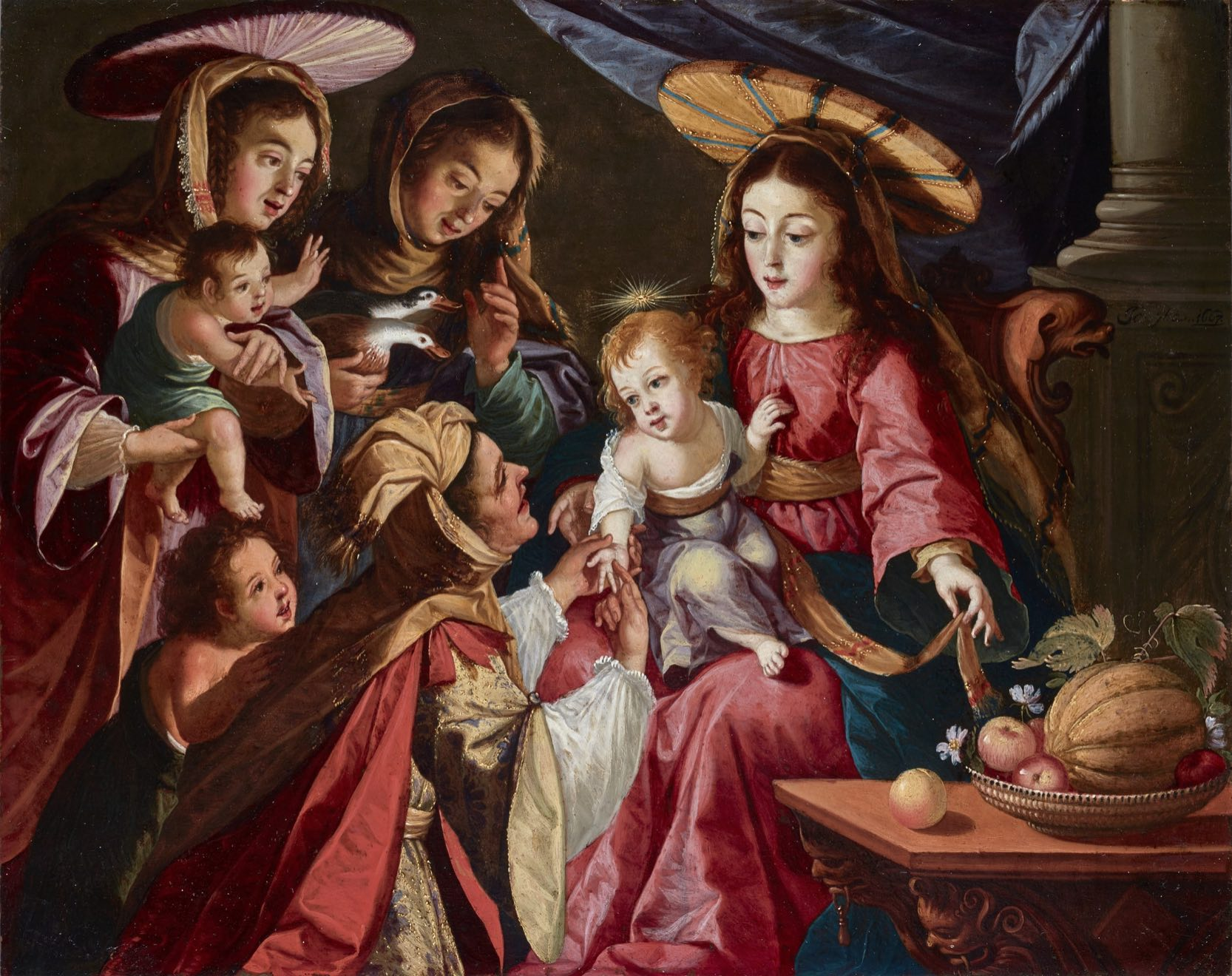
The infant Jesus having his fortune told whilst sitting on the lap of the Madonna, 1667

Her best known portrait is that of Faustino das Neves, dated c. 1670, which is in the Municipal Museum of Óbidos.

On Christmas Eve 2014, the work A Sagrada Família from 1644, located in a chapel at the Convent of Santa Cruz do Buçaco, was destroyed in a fire. A subsequent investigation proved to be inconclusive despite having included laboratory examinations of samples removed by the Judiciary Police at the scene of the incident, and concluded that contextualized painting pigments from the 17th century were in fact identified, namely white lead pigment and ochre.

== Historiography ==
Josefa de Óbidos was included in several treatises and collections of biographies of artists written in the seventeenth through nineteenth centuries. Vitor Serrão has noted that in many of these writings, "Josefa de Ayala took on mythic proportions by authors awed by the fact that the artist was a woman." In his 1696 treatise on painting, Félix da Costa Meesen counted Josefa among the most important Portuguese artists, writing that she was "acclaimed far and wide, especially in the neighboring countries..." In 1736, Damião de Froes Perym praised her "talent, beauty, and honesty," as well as her "attractiveness." In the nineteenth-century unpublished text Memorias historicas e diferentes apontamentos acerca das antiguidades de Óbidos, by an anonymous author, Josefa is described as being "well known in and outside the kingdom for her paintings, in which she was unique during the time she flourished, as someone who practiced the perfections of art to notable applause and honest praise, living all her life in chaste celibacy." This text also describes how Josefa had a close relationship with the queen of Portugal, D. Maria Francisca of Savoy.

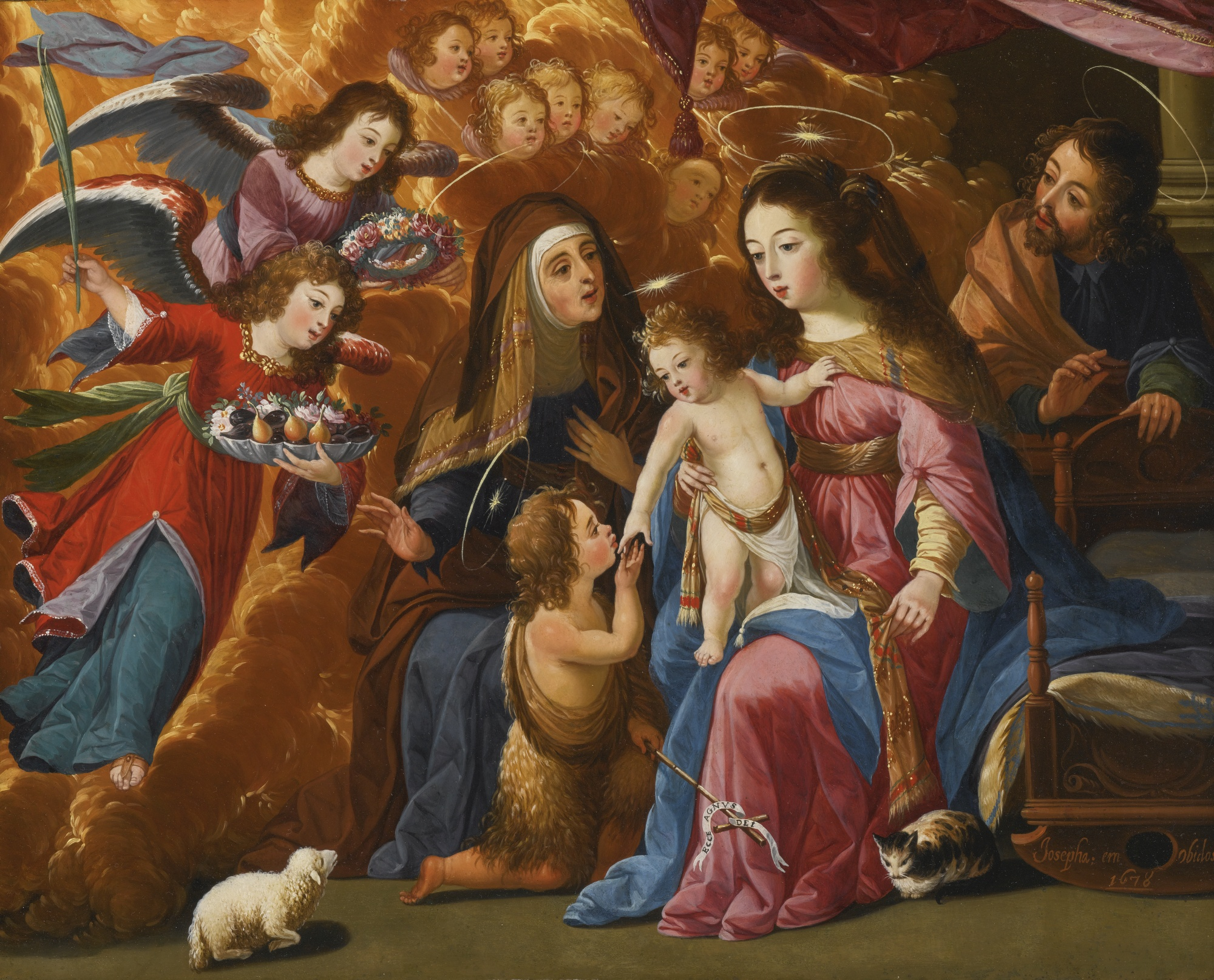
The Holy Family with Saint John the Baptist, Saint Elizabeth, and Angels, 1678

In many of these sources, the authors attributed various paintings, which are now known to be by different authors, to Josefa. Beginning in 1949, art historians began to more critically evaluate her body of work; in an exhibition held in the Museu Nacional de Arte Antiga (Lisbon), curators assembled a list of fifty-three works that could definitively be declared autograph. In 1957, Luis Reis-Santo produced the first monograph on Josefa's work, expanding on her known oeuvre.

== Exhibitions ==
- Exposição das pinturas de Josefa de Óbidos (Ayala), Museu Nacional de Arte Antiga, Lisbon, 1949
- Josefa de Óbidos e o tempo barroco, Galeria de Pintura do Rei D. Luis, Lisbon, 1991
- The Sacred and the Profane: Josefa de Óbidos of Portugal, The National Museum of Women in the Arts, Washington, DC, 1997
- Josefa de Óbidos e a invenção do Barroco Português, Museu Nacional de Arte Antiga, Lisbon, 2015
- The National Gallery, London held a conference 3 July 2026 to highlight the work of Josepha de Obridos in international collections.

== Gallery ==
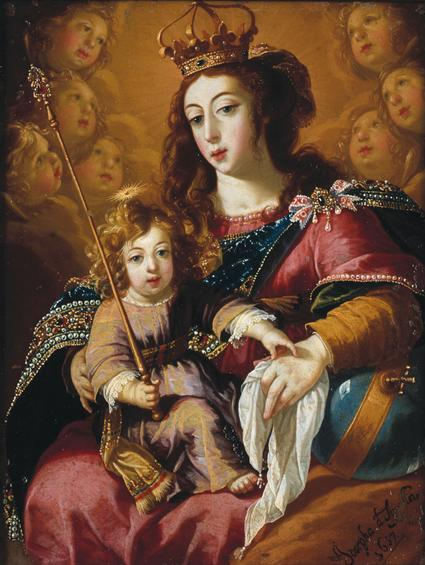
Virgin and Child, 1657, oil on copper miniature

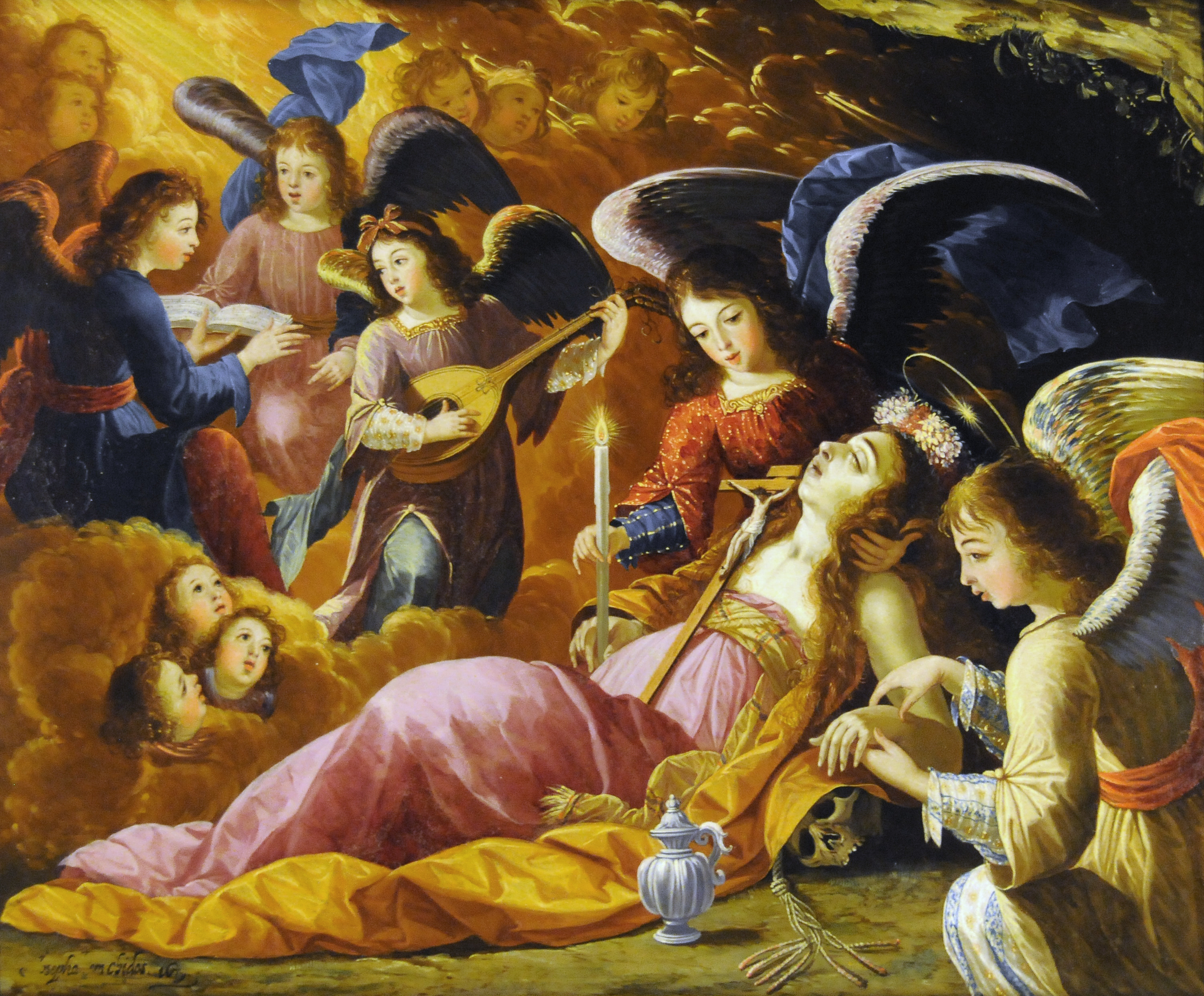
The Penitent Magdalene Comforted by Angels, 1679

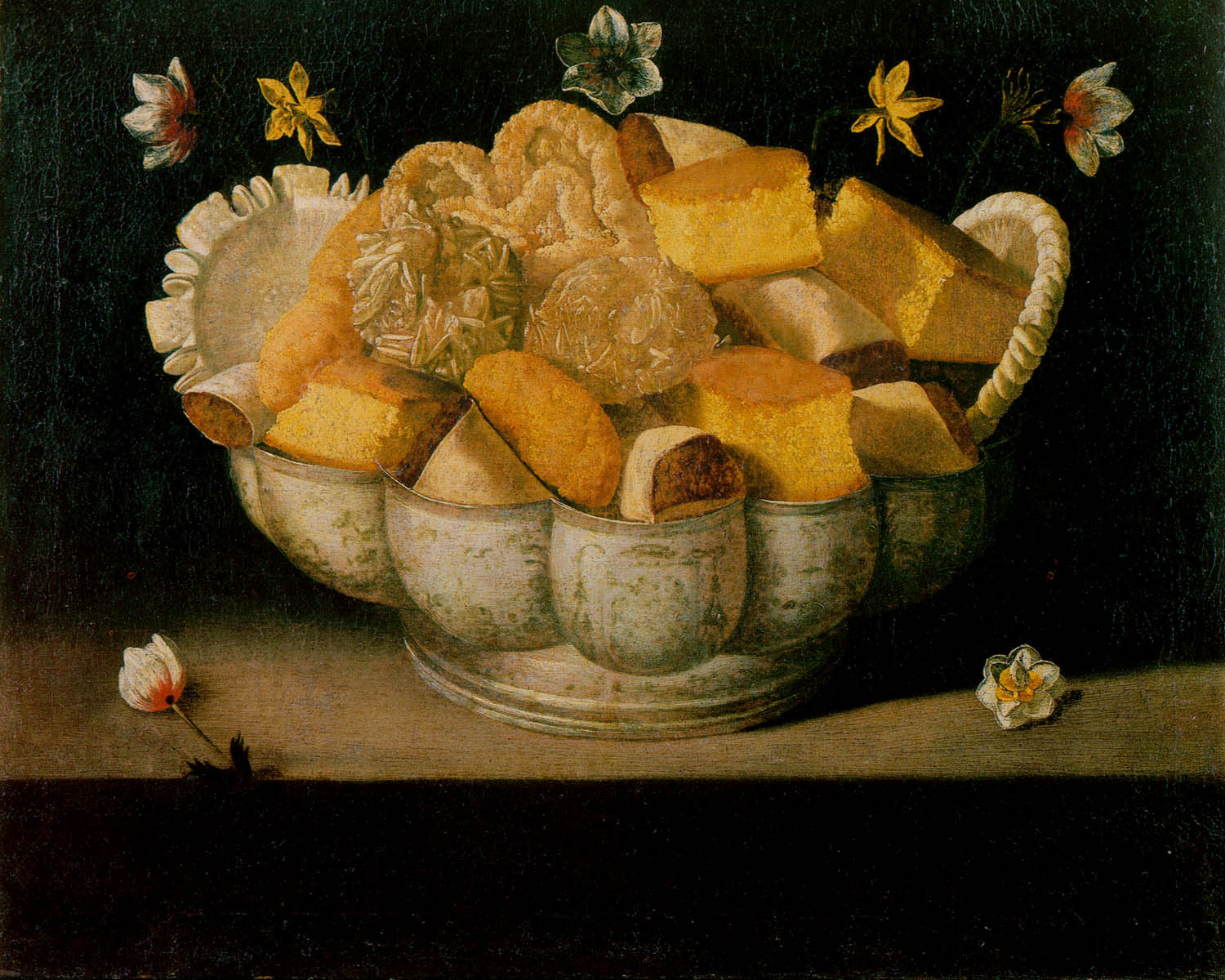
Still life with cakes

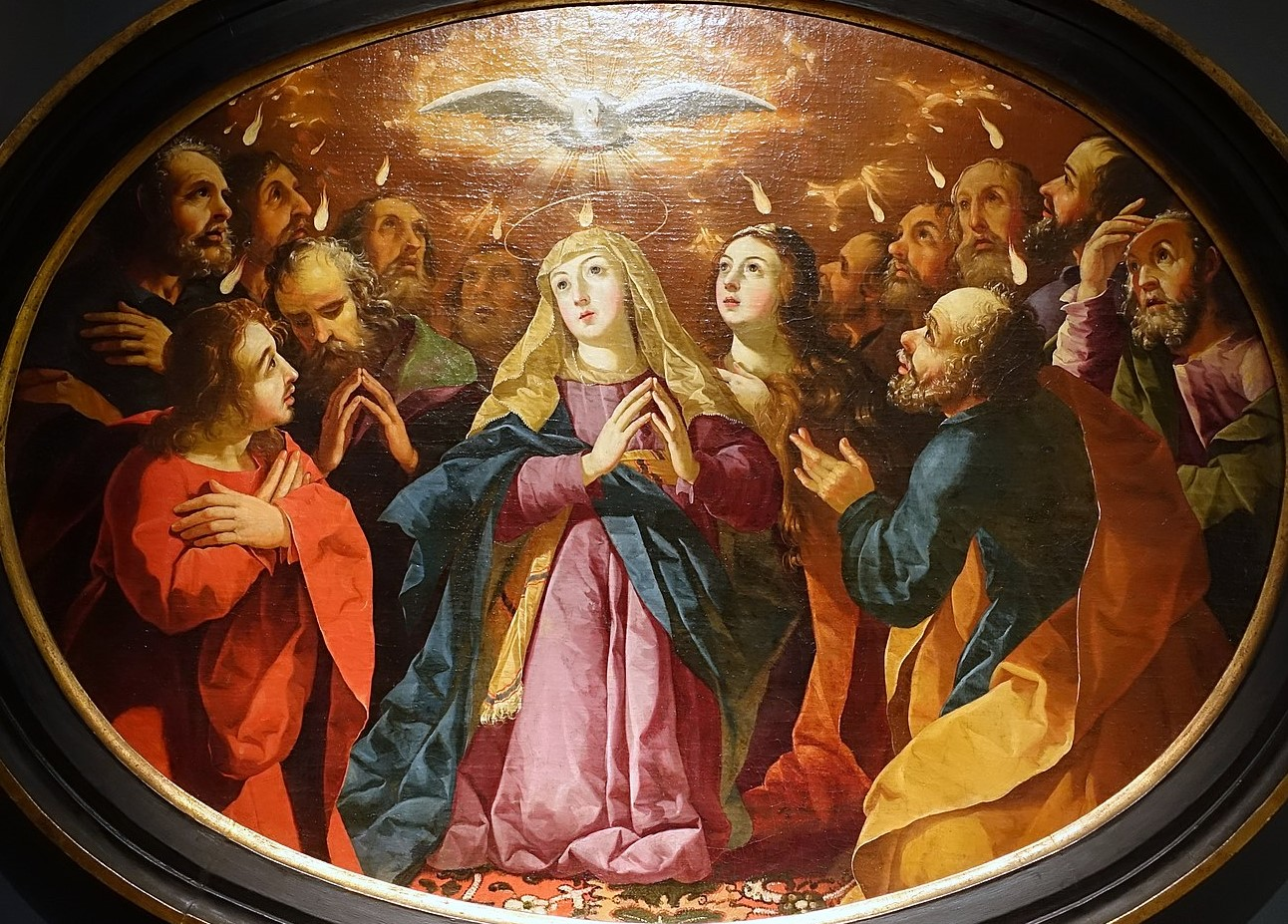
Pentecost
