= Baptism of Christ (El Greco, Rome) =

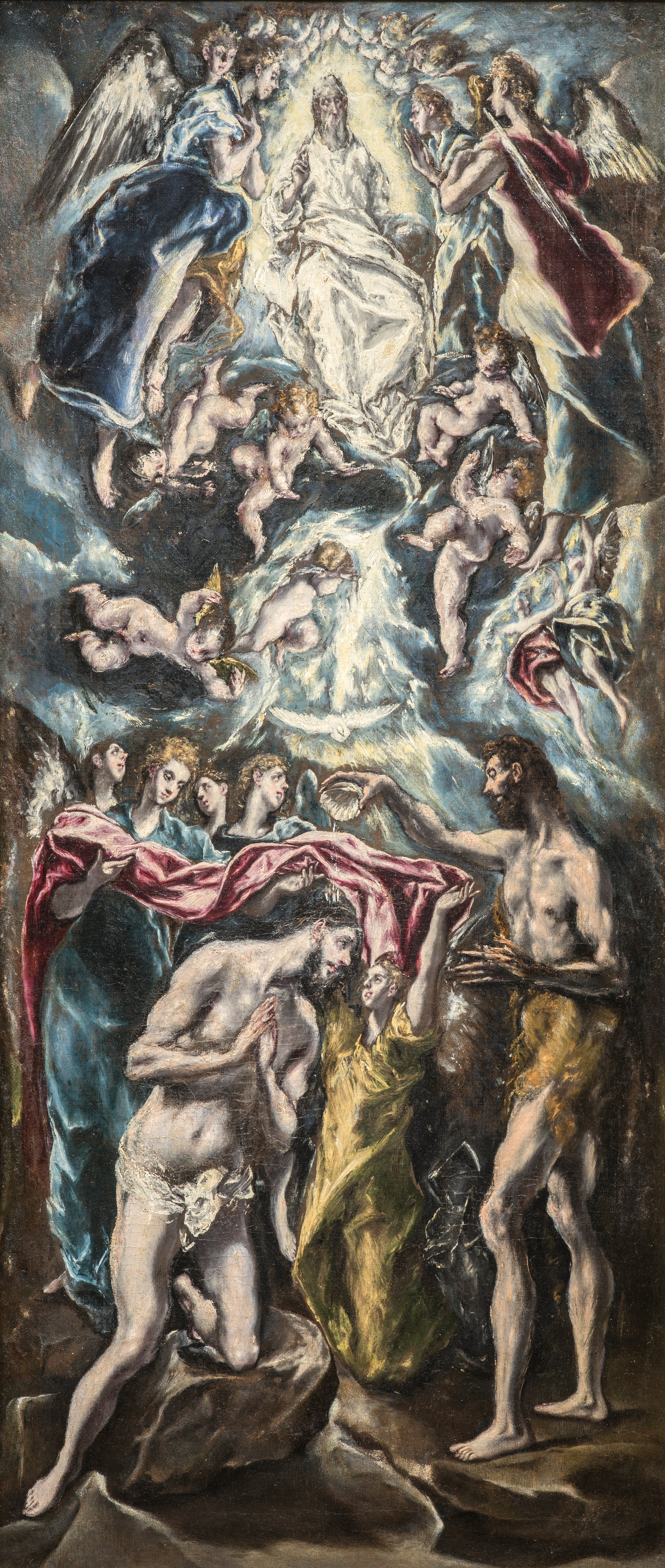

Baptism of Christ is a 1596-1600 oil on canvas painting by El Greco, now in the Galleria Nazionale d'Arte Antica in Rome, which acquired it in 1908. In the first catalogue of the artist's works (made by his son Jorge Manuel Theotocópuli after the artist's death) there is only one work with the title of Baptism of Christ, whilst in the second catalogue there are two, either of which could be the work now in Rome.

It is a pendant to Adoration of the Shepherds (also in the Galleria Nazionale d'Arte Antica). It is a replica of or sketch for the work of the same subject that formed part of the Doña María de Aragón Altarpiece.

== See also ==
- List of works by El Greco

== Bibliography (in Spanish) ==
- Álvarez Lopera, José. (2014). El Greco, La obra esencial. Editorial Sílex. Madrid. ISBN 978-84-7737-8600;
- Gudiol, José. (1982). Doménikos Theotokópoulos, El Greco. Ediciones Polígrafa. Barcelona. ISBN 84-343-0031-1;
- Frati, Tiziana. (1970). La obra pictórica completa de El Greco. Noguer Rizzoli. Barcelona-Milán:
- Wethey, Harold. (1967). El Greco y su Escuela (Volumen-II). Ediciones Guadarrama. Madrid.
