= Igreja da Graça =

Igreja da Graça may refer to:

- Igreja da Graça (Coimbra)
- Igreja da Graça (Santarém)
- Igreja da Graça (Évora)
