= The Penitent Magdalene Comforted by Angels =

Painting by Josefa de Óbidos

- Artist: Josefa de Óbidos
- Year: 1679
- Type: Oil on copper
- Dimensions: 34 cm × 42.2 cm (13 in × 16.6 in)
- Location: Louvre, Paris

The Penitent Magdalene Comforted by Angels is an oil on copper painting by the Portuguese artist Josefa de Óbidos, from 1679. This horizontal religious painting is a depiction of Mary Magdalene surrounded by angels during her penance. The work is signed and dated in the lower left corner. It is held in the Louvre, in Paris.

== Description ==
This is a relatively late painting by the artist, expressing her piety and the profound sense of mysticism that permeated much of her work. The composition is centered on a candle, which a heavenly messenger helps the young Magdalene keep upright, supporting her head as she lies on her back with her eyes closed.Magdalene is depicted at the very moment of her conversion. Still dressed in rich satin robes, she wears a crown of flowers and is dressed in pink and orange. She has a crucifix on her chest and a human skull under her left hand, which another angel holds in the foreground, in the lower right corner. She has fainted in ecstasy before a vision of heaven in the form of musical angels on swirling clouds, while two kneeling angels tenderly support her. In the foreground are her usual attributes: the ointment jar, a skull, and a whip, to which Óbidos carefully added the detail of dried blood.

The influence of Francisco de Zurbarán is evident in the luminous touches of white and cream, as well as in the facial features and fabrics.

== Provenace ==
The painting belonged to the private collection of Júlio Lima, a wealthy industrialist from Braga. The work was acquired in January 2015 at a Sotheby's auction in New York for $269,000 (€238,615) by Philippe Esteve Mendes, a French-Portuguese founder of the Mendes art gallery in Paris. Mendes donated the work to the Louvre Museum, also securing its inclusion in its permanent collection. The painting was finally exhibited on November 24, 2016, in the museum's galleries, alongside Baltazar Gomes Figueira's Still Life with Fish, and a painting by the Spanish artist Francisco de Zurbarán, in a small room that also houses a work by Diego Velázquez, next to the long gallery of Spanish paintings.

Until then, Gomes Figueira's work was the only Portuguese painting on display at the Louvre, which also owned another painting by Domingos Sequeira, that was not on public display.
