= Adoration of the Shepherds (El Greco, Rome) =

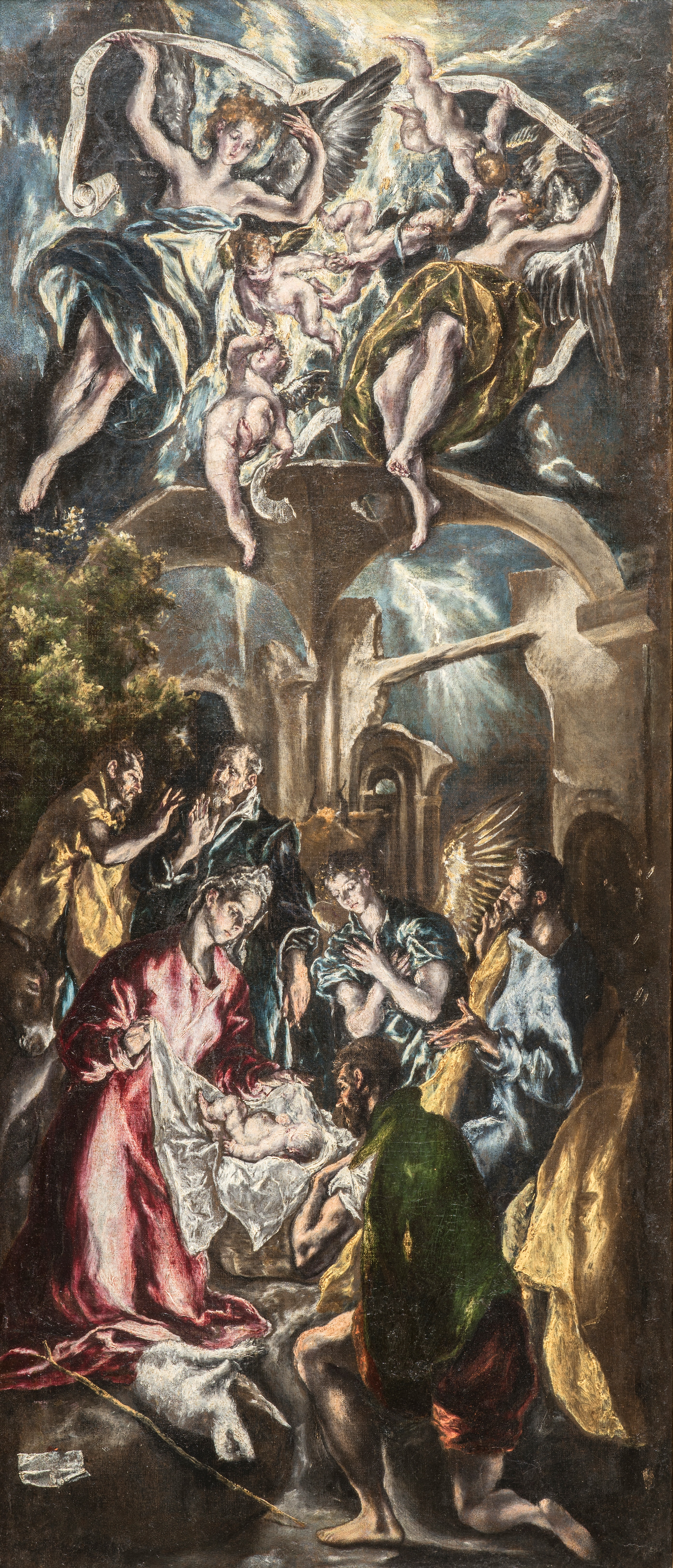

Adoration of the Shepherds is a 1596-1600 oil on canvas painting by El Greco, now in the Galleria Nazionale d'Arte Antica in Rome, which acquired it in 1908. It appears in Harold Wethey's catalogue raisonné as n º. 25 and Tiziana Frati's as 107 A-a.

It was produced as a pendant to the artist's Baptism of Christ (also in the Galleria Nazionale d'Arte Antica). It is a small-scale replica of (or possibly sketch for) Adoration of the Shepherds.

== See also ==
- List of works by El Greco

== Bibliography (in Spanish) ==
- Álvarez Lopera, José. (2014). El Greco, La obra esencial. Editorial Sílex. Madrid. ISBN 978-84-7737-8600;
- Gudiol, José. (1982). Doménikos Theotokópoulos, El Greco. Ediciones Polígrafa. Barcelona. ISBN 84-343-0031-1;
- Frati, Tiziana. (1970). La obra pictórica completa de El Greco. Noguer Rizzoli. Barcelona-Milán:
- Wethey, Harold. (1967). El Greco y su Escuela (Volumen-II). Ediciones Guadarrama. Madrid.
