= The Holy Family with Saint John the Baptist, Saint Elizabeth, and Angels =

Painting by Josefa de Óbidos

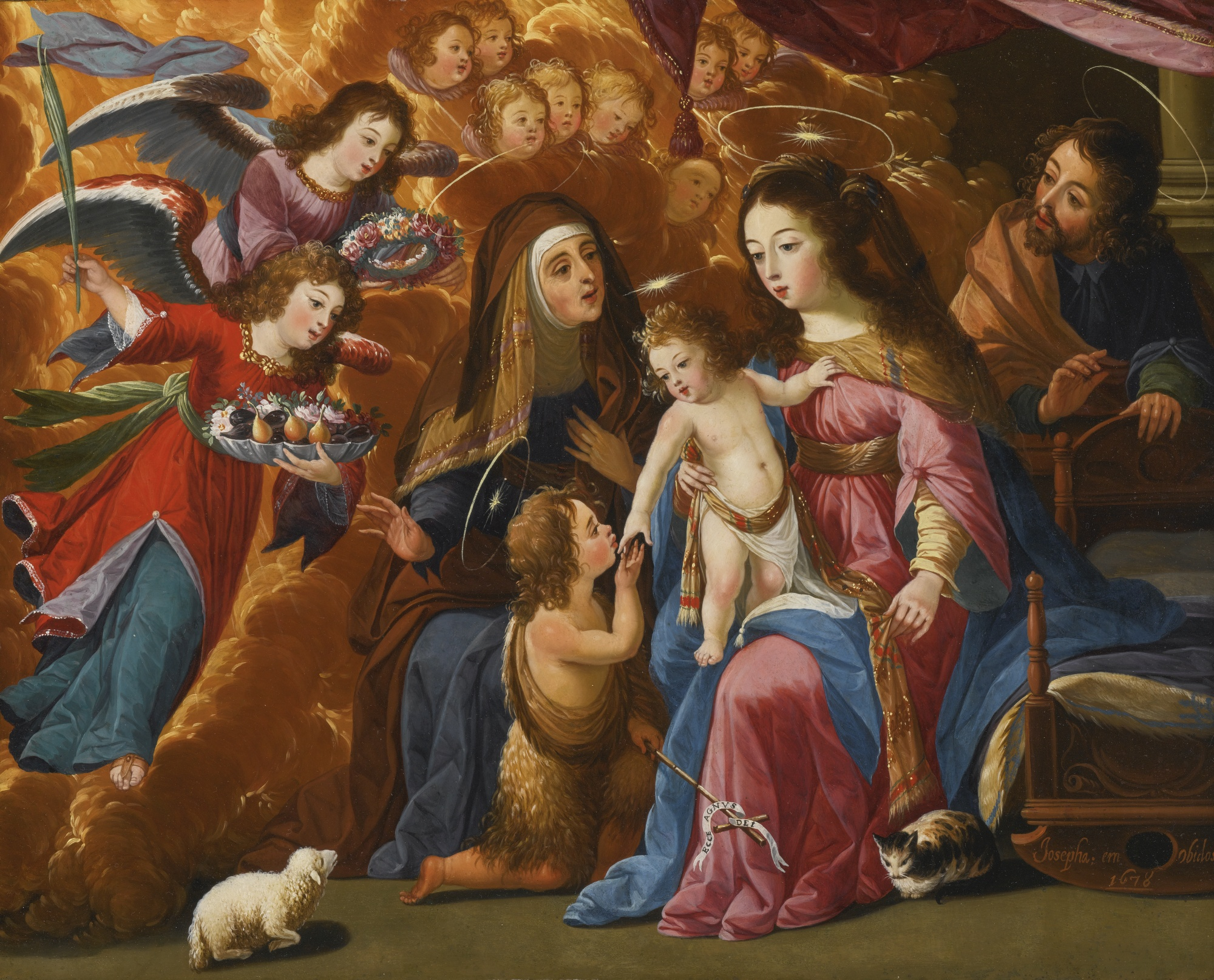
- Artist: Josefa de Óbidos
- Year: 1678
- Type: Oil on copper
- Dimensions: 32.2 cm × 43.1 cm (12.7 in × 17.0 in)
- Location: Museu da Misericórdia do Porto, Porto

The Holy Family with Saint John the Baptist, Saint Elizabeth, and Angels is an oil on copper painting by the Portuguese artist Josefa de Óbidos, from 1678. It is held at the Museu da Misericórdia do Porto, in Porto.

== Description ==
This painting on copper dates back to the artist's mature period. The Holy Family is depicted alongside Saint Elizabeth and the infant Saint John the Baptist with exquisite detail and a particular focus on the various fabrics they wear. St. Joseph holds the cradle where the Child Jesus sleeps, which the artist signed and dated. He is on the lap of the Virgin Mary, while the child John the Baptist kisses His hand, watched by his mother, St. Elizabeth, dressed in a nun's habit. The group of the Holy Family, St. Joseph and the Virgin Mary, with the Child Jesus, together with John and Elizabeth, on the right and center of the composition, have for golden background a somewhat theatrical gathering of angels and cherubs.

== Art market ==
The painting was acquired for $250,000 (€228,000) on January 28, 2016, by the Museu da Misericórdia from Porto at Sotheby's New York. This acquisition came following an appeal by the gallerist Filipe Mendes, who in 2015 had acquired the work Penitent Magdalene Comforted by Angels, also by Josefa de Óbidos, which he ultimately donated to the Louvre.
