= Still Life with Sweets and Pottery =

1676 painting by Josefa de Óbidos

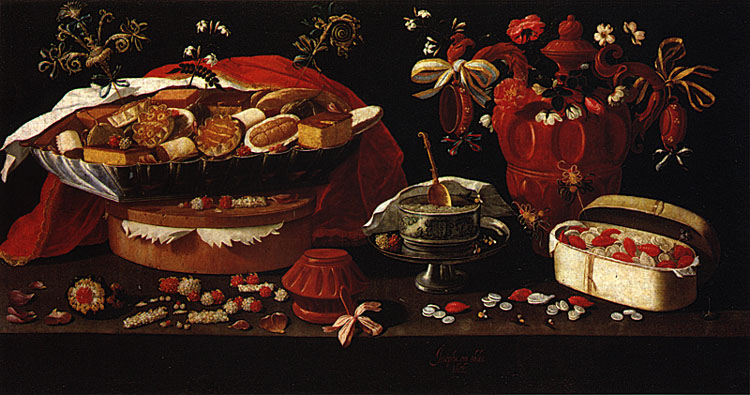
- Artist: Josefa de Óbidos
- Year: 1676
- Medium: Oil on canvas
- Dimensions: 84 cm × 160.5 cm (33 in × 63.2 in)
- Location: Biblioteca Municipal Braamcamp Freire, Santarém

Still Life with Sweets and Pottery is an oil on canvas painting by the Portuguese artist Josefa de Óbidos, from 1676. It is held in the Biblioteca Municipal Braamcamp Freire, in Santarém.

== Description ==
This painting shows a sumptuous display of sweets in various pottery containers and in the center a silver sugar holder with a gold spoon emphasizes the wealth of this dessert spread. Far from normal, such a spread would have been beyond reach of most townspeople and the artist herself at that time and was either meant to represent an ideal holiday feast or was commissioned by a wealthy patron. The "Bodegón" style is reminiscent of earlier dessert displays by Juan van der Hamen and others of the Spanish school a generation before her.

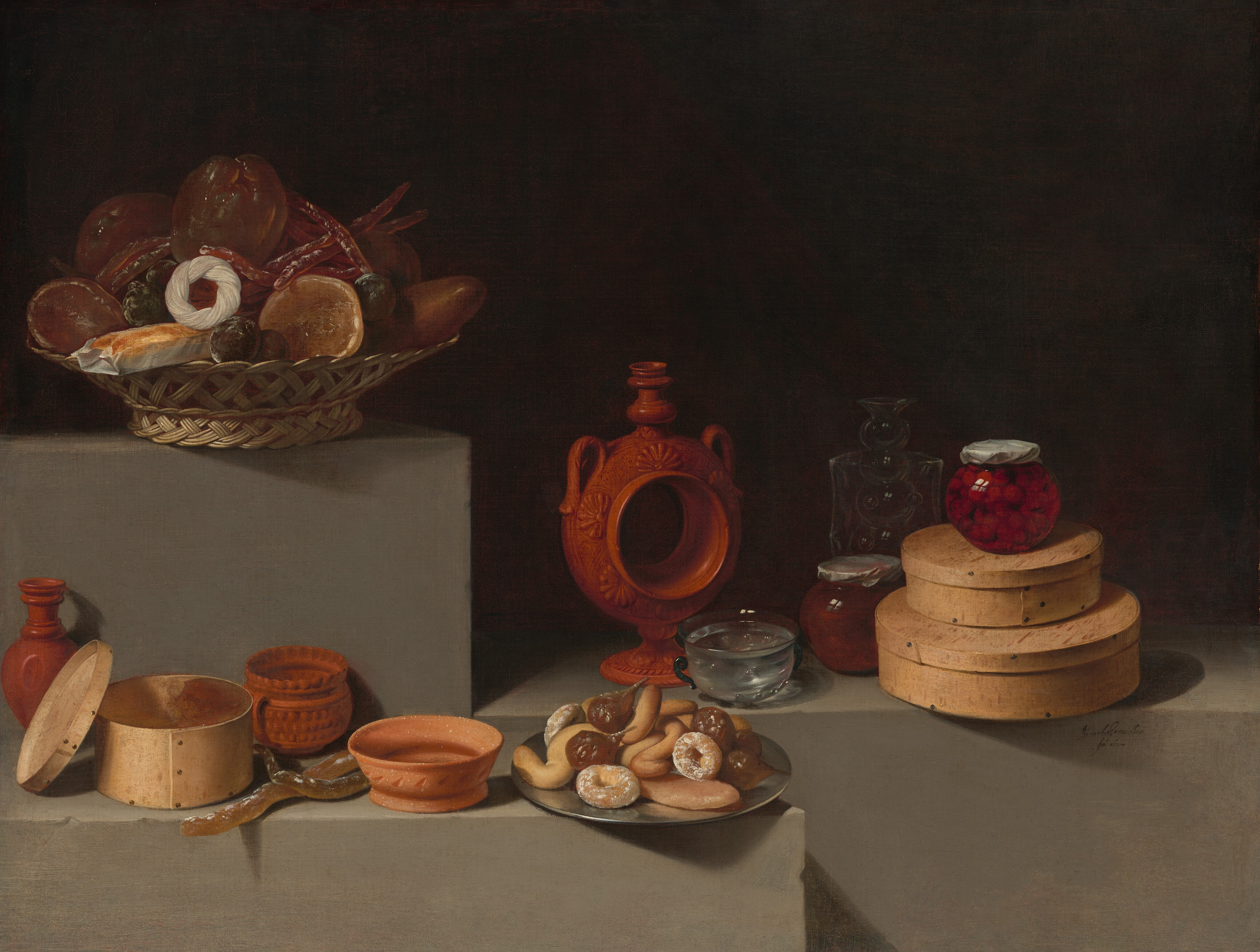
Still Life with Sweets and Pottery by Juan van der Hamen, 1627

This painting is a pendant of Still Life with Sweets and Flowers in the same collection:

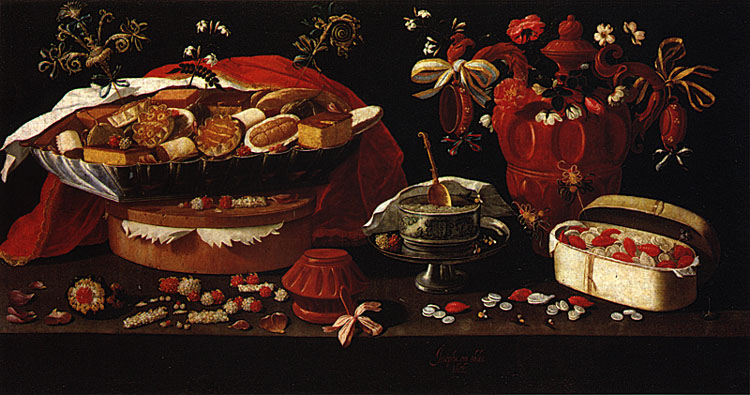

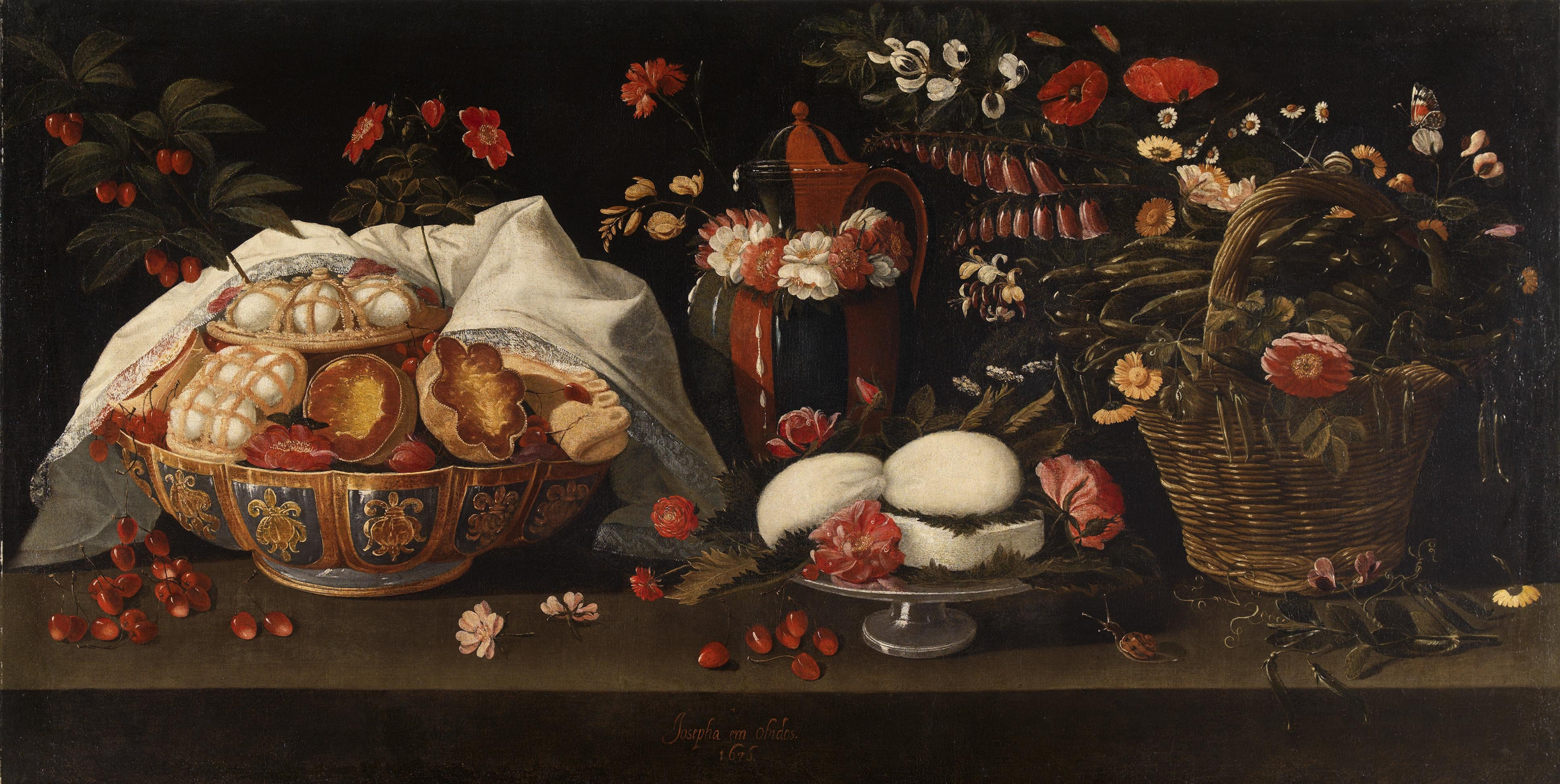
