= Adoration of the Shepherds (El Greco, New York) =

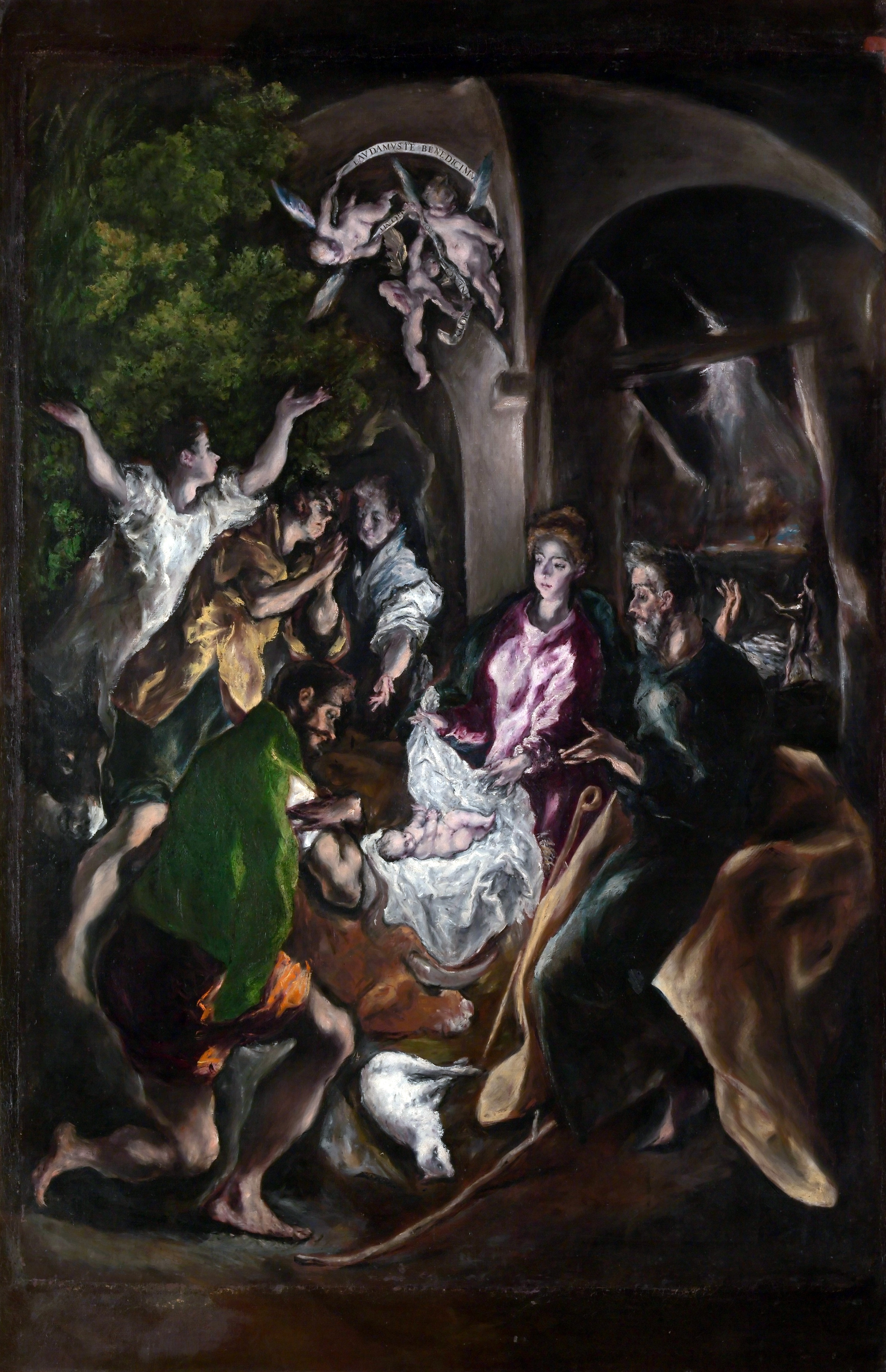

Adoration of the Shepherds is a 1605-1610 oil on canvas painting by El Greco, now in the Metropolitan Museum of Art in New York. It is nº. 27 in Harold Wethey's catalogue raisonné of the artist's work and reference 133-b in that by Tiziana Frati. It was owned by Duque de Híjar and Luis Navas in Madrid, then in Scotland by E. Lawson and D. McCorkindale.

It is very similar to the work on the same subject now in Valencia, though the New York work's canvas is finer. In the Valencia version, an angel raises his left hand directly towards the shepherd, who is slightly younger, whilst in the New York work he moves his hand slightly towards the Christ Child. This suggests the Valencia work was earlier and possibly unfinished and that both works may be very high quality copies of a lost original.

== See also ==
- List of works by El Greco

== Bibliography (in Spanish) ==
- Álvarez Lopera, José (2014). El Greco. La obra esencial. Madrid: Sílex.
- Frati, Tiziana (1970). La obra pictórica completa de El Greco. Barcelona-Milano: Noguer Rizzoli.
- Gudiol, José (1982). Doménikos Theotokópoulos, El Greco, 1541-1614. Barcelona: Ediciones Polígrafa.
- Wethey, Harold Edwin (1967). El Greco y su escuela. Vol. II. Translated by Carlos Cid Priego. Madrid: Guadarrama.
