= Doña María de Aragón Altarpiece =

Altarpiece painted by El Greco

The Doña María de Aragón Altarpiece was an altarpiece painted between 1596 and 1599 by El Greco for the chapel of the Colegio de la Encarnación (also known as the Colegio de doña María de Aragón) in Madrid. The college was secularised during Goya's lifetime and the altarpiece was dismantled. There has been much speculation over which paintings belonged to the work. The consensus view is that it consisted of six large canvases and a seventh, now lost. Five of those six canvases are now in the Prado and the sixth is in the National Museum of Art of Romania in Bucharest.

== History ==
In 1596 El Greco undertook to make the altarpiece for the church of the college, a seminary of the Augustinian order. The popular name alludes to María de Córdoba y Aragón, the patron who paid for the works, lady of Queen Anne of Austria and daughter of Don Álvaro de Córdoba, senior knight of Philip II. El Greco was commissioned by the Council of Castile, which had taken charge of the works after the death of Doña María. There are documents that attest that it was to be done in three years and the work was valued at just over sixty-three thousand reales, the highest price he got in his life. However, there are no references to the number of paintings that formed it, nor to the structure of the altarpiece, nor to the subject matter. Ceán Bermúdez, two centuries later, said that the paintings dealt with the cycle of the life of Christ.

== Composition ==
=== Names, dimensions and museums ===
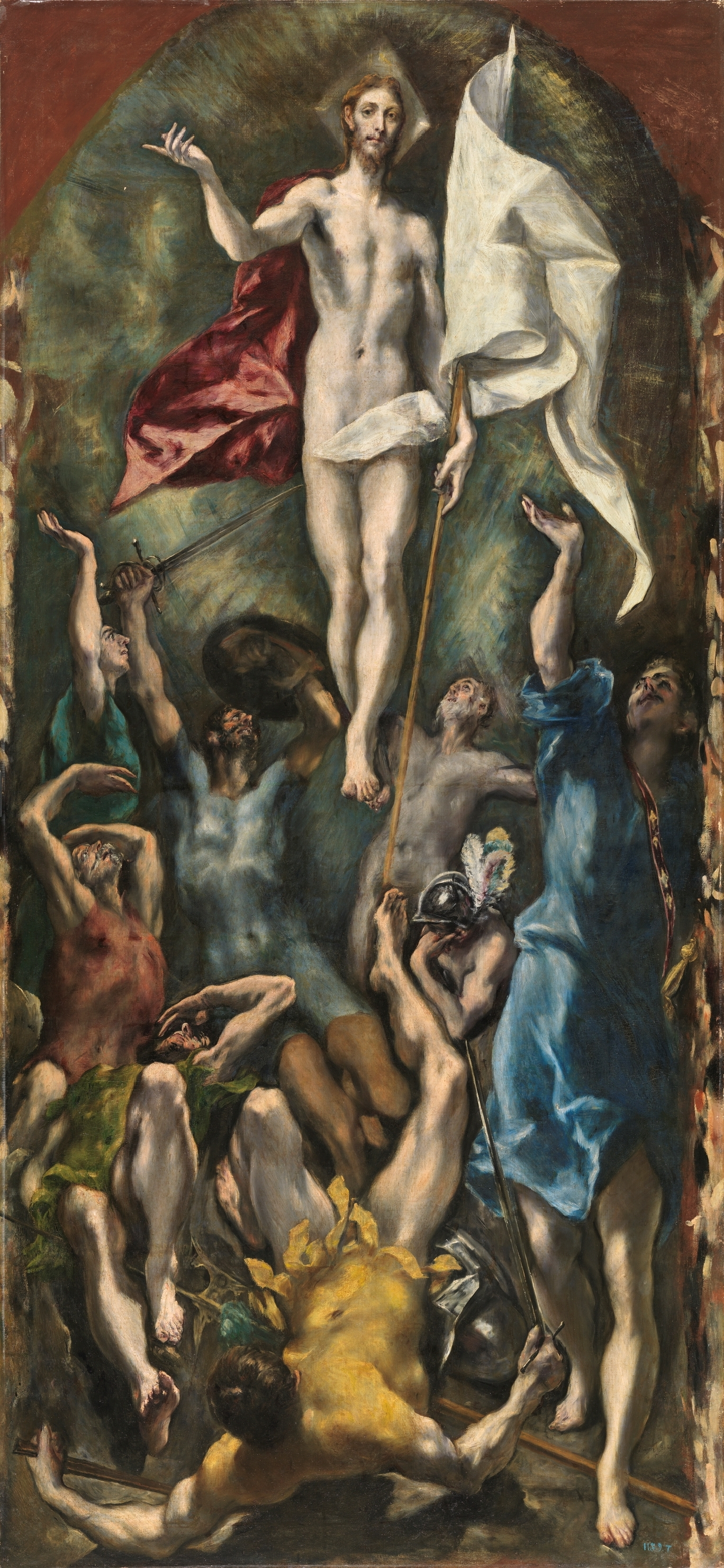
Resurrection
1597-1600
275 x 127 cm
Museo del Prado (Madrid)

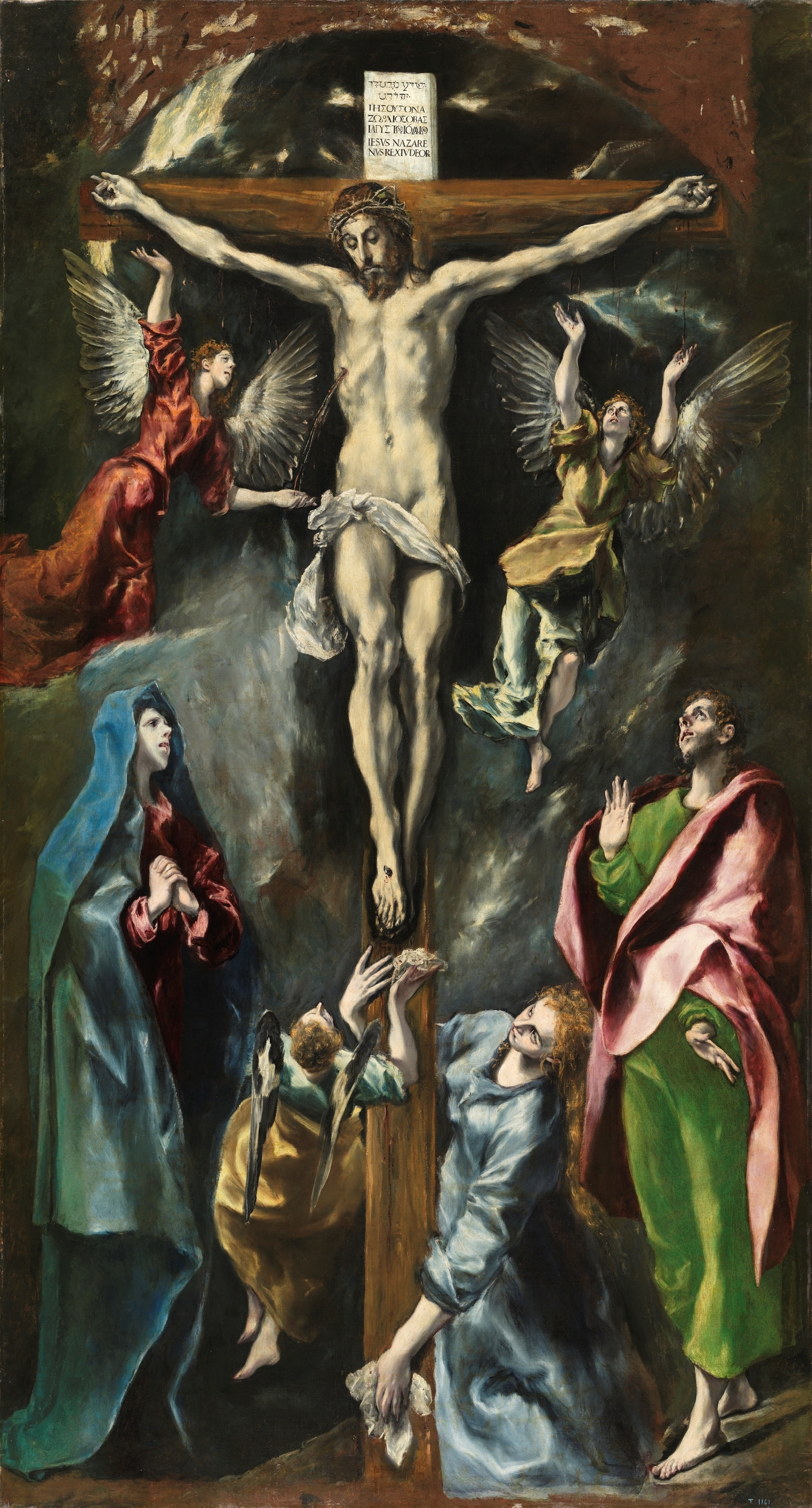
Crucifixion
1597-1600
312 x 169 cm
Museo del Prado (Madrid)

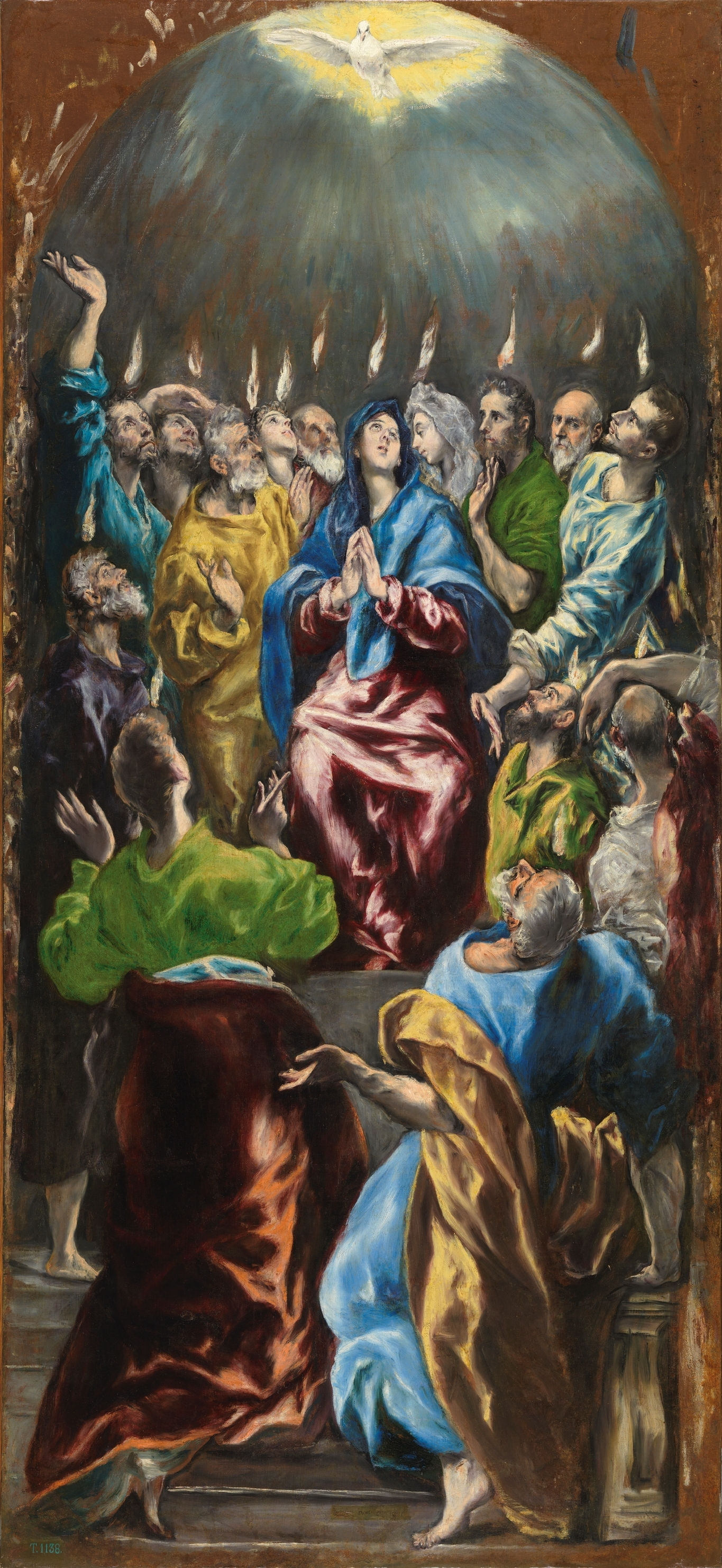
Pentecost
1597-1600
275 x 127 cm
Museo del Prado (Madrid)

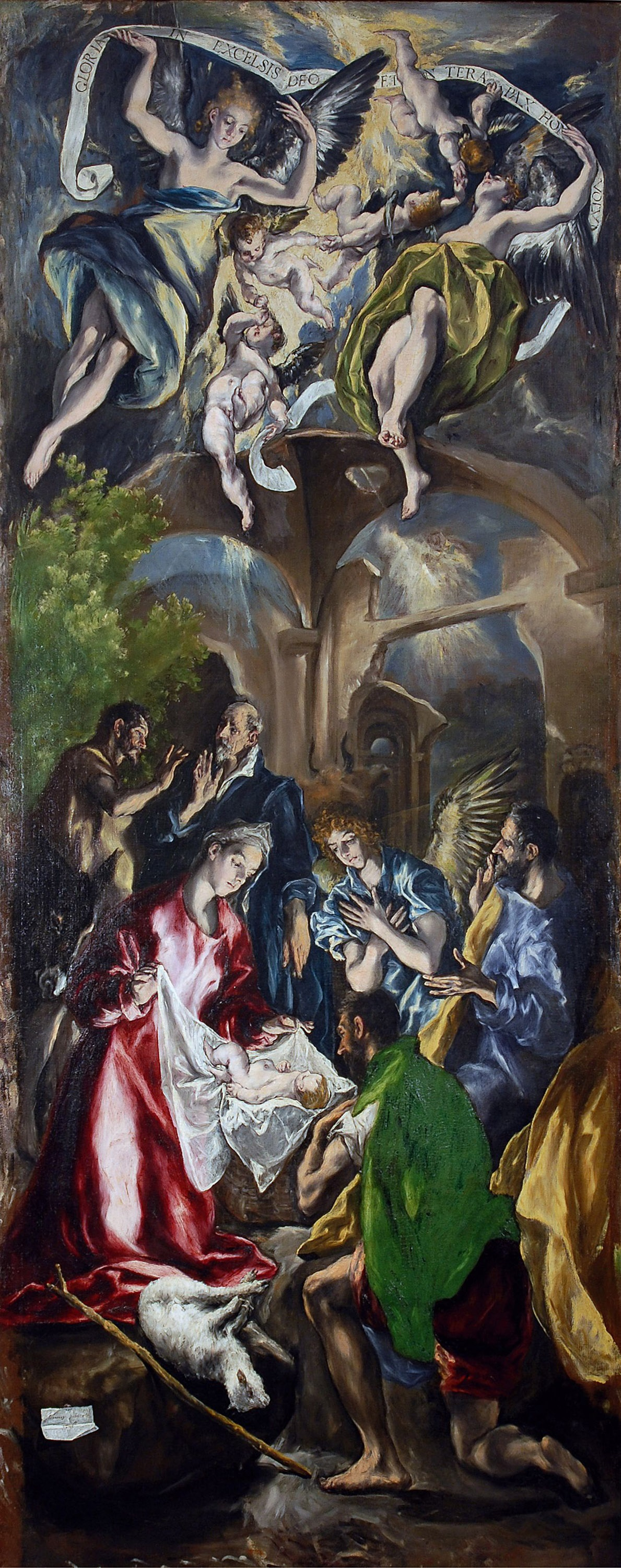
Adoration of Shepherds
1597-1600
364 x 137 cm
National Museum of Art of Romania (Bucharest)

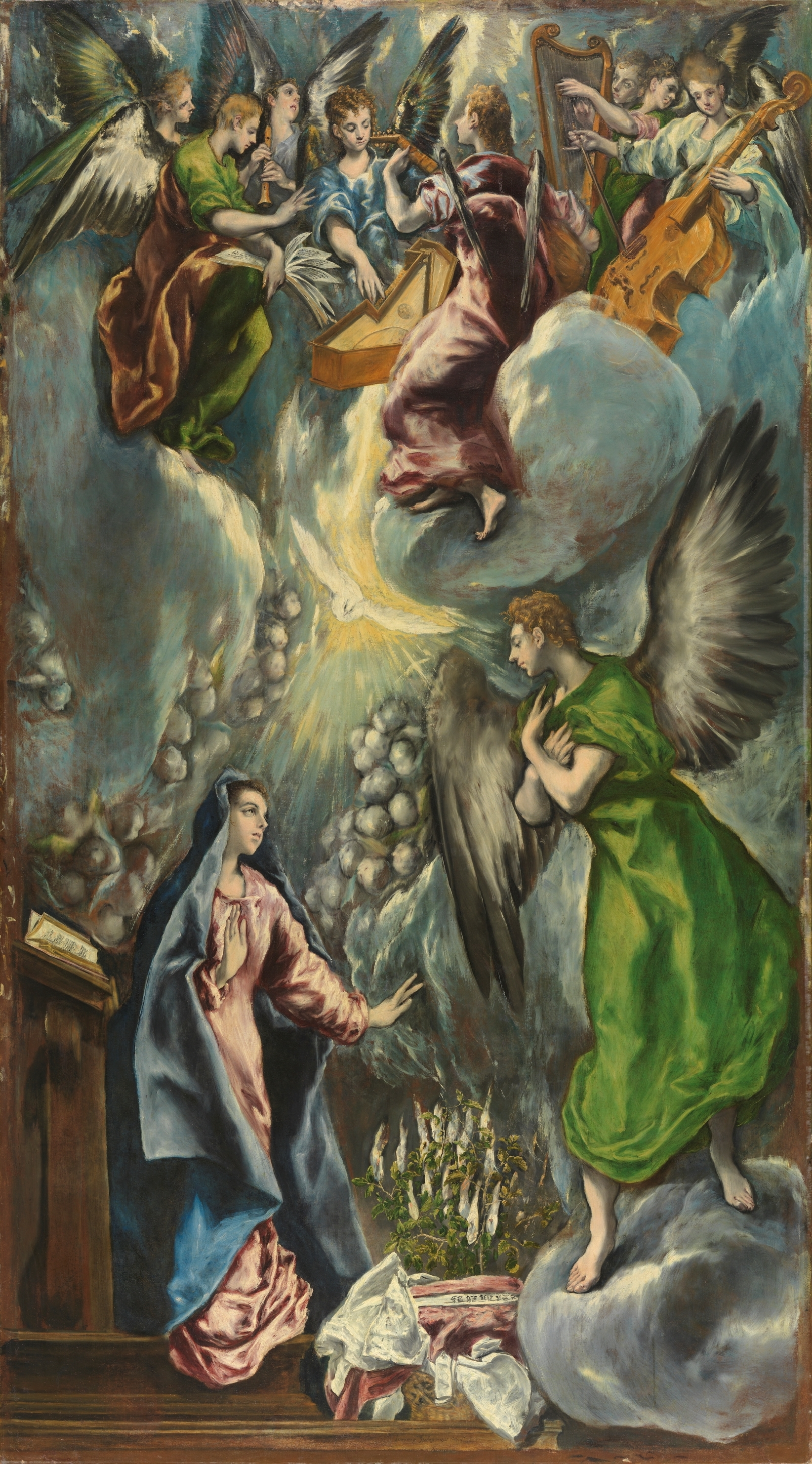
Annunciation
1597-1600
315 x 174 cm
Museo del Prado (Madrid)

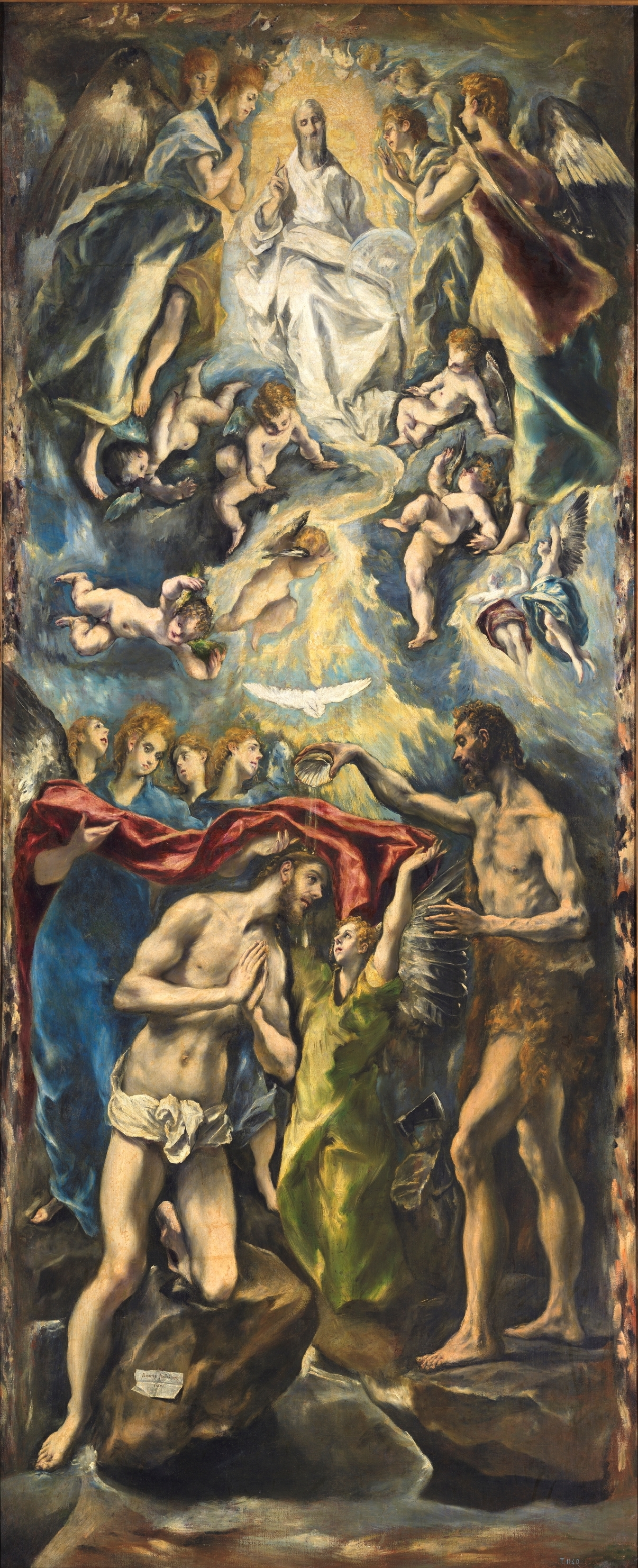
Baptism of Christ
1597-1600
315 x 144 cm
Museo del Prado (Madrid)

== See also ==
- List of works by El Greco

== Bibliography (in Spanish) ==
- Pita Andrade, José Manuel (1985). El Greco. Carrogio SA de Ediciones. ISBN 84-7254-514-8.
- Cossío, Manuel B. (1965). El Greco. Espasa Calpe Argentina, S.A. ISBN 84-7254-514-8.
- Gudiol, José (1982). El Greco. Ediciones Poligrafa S.A. ISBN 84-343-0031-1.
- Tazartes, Mauricia (2004). «Las Obras Maestras». El Greco. 2005 Unidad Editorial S.A. ISBN 84-89780-99-4.
- Buendía, José Rogelio (1988). «El Greco, humanismo y pintura». El Greco. Sarpe. ISBN 84-7700-088-3.
- Ruiz Gómez, Leticia (2007). El Greco. Museo Nacional del Prado. ISBN 978-84-8480-135-1.
