= Adoration of the Shepherds (Lucas Cranach the Elder) =

Painting by Lucas Cranach the Elder

Nativity
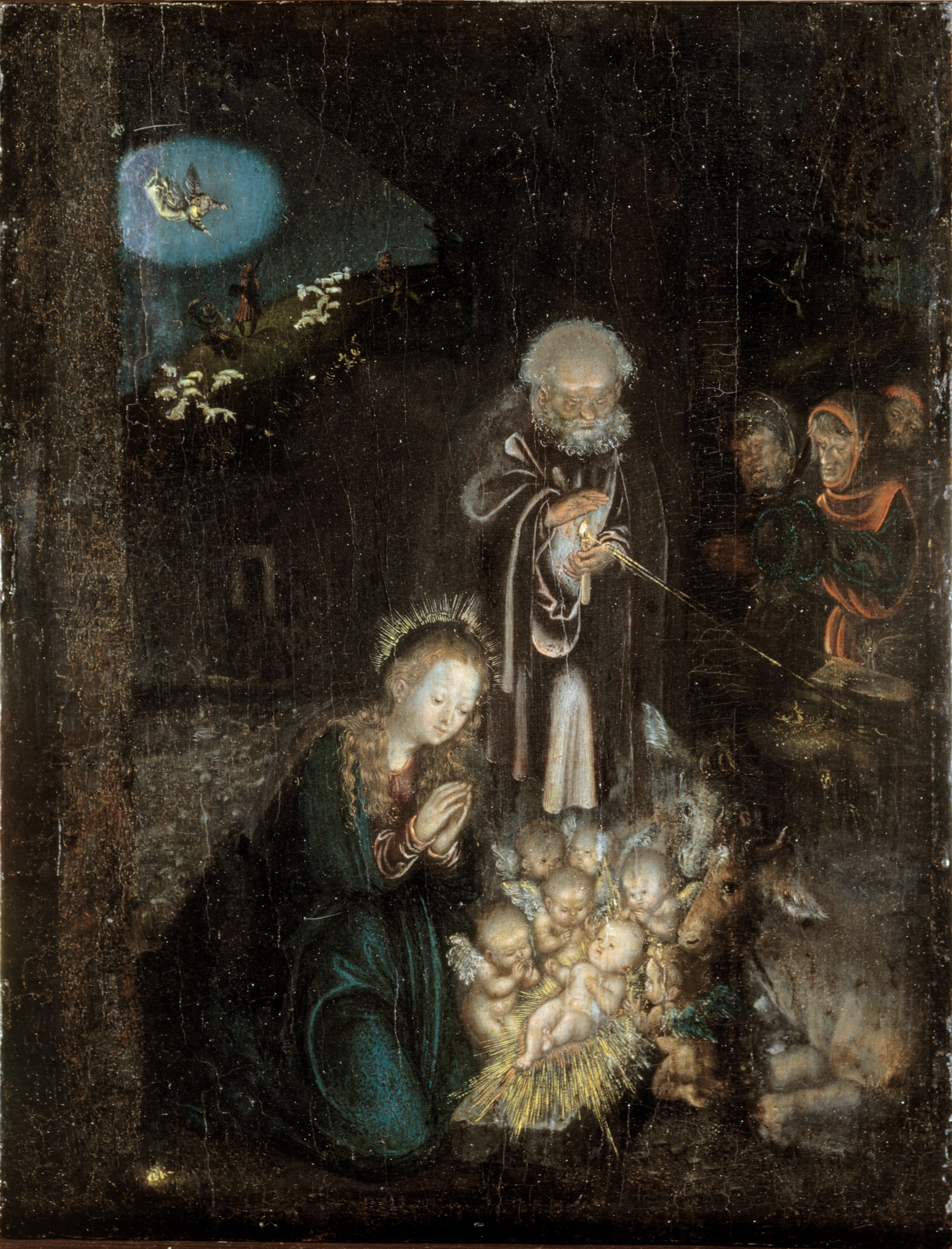
- Year: 1515–1520
- Medium: oil paint
- Dimensions: 32 cm (13 in) × 24.5 cm (9.6 in)
- Location: Gemäldegalerie Alte Meister
- Collection: Staatliche Kunstsammlungen Dresden
- Accession No.: 1907 A
- Identifiers: RKDimages ID: 237952

The Adoration of the Shepherds (German: Anbetung der Hirten) is a c. 1515–1520 oil on panel painting of the Nativity by the German artist Lucas Cranach the Elder in the collection of the Gemäldegalerie Alte Meister in Dresden.

== Painting ==
The Adoration of the Shepherds shows a nocturnal scene with Mary bending over the Child in prayer. Joseph is standing over them holding a candle, but the main light source is coming from the crib. The Child lies on a bed of hay that matches his Mother's halo, surrounded by winged cherubs. In the upper left of the frame, a vista to a moonlit landscape reveals on closer inspection to be a scene of the Annunciation to the shepherds with Gabriel as the moon and three shepherds in a field. The same three shepherds stand behind a fence on the right side of the painting looking at the Holy Family.

The painting was painted around the time when Martin Luther first spoke out about the light of the Gospels and used the candle as a metaphor for revelation. In his work translating the bible and spreading his message, he hired Cranach to make illustrations and a candle featured in many of them. This same scene in a simplified form was even featured in one of Cranach's woodcuts for Luther's Passional Christi und Antichristi:

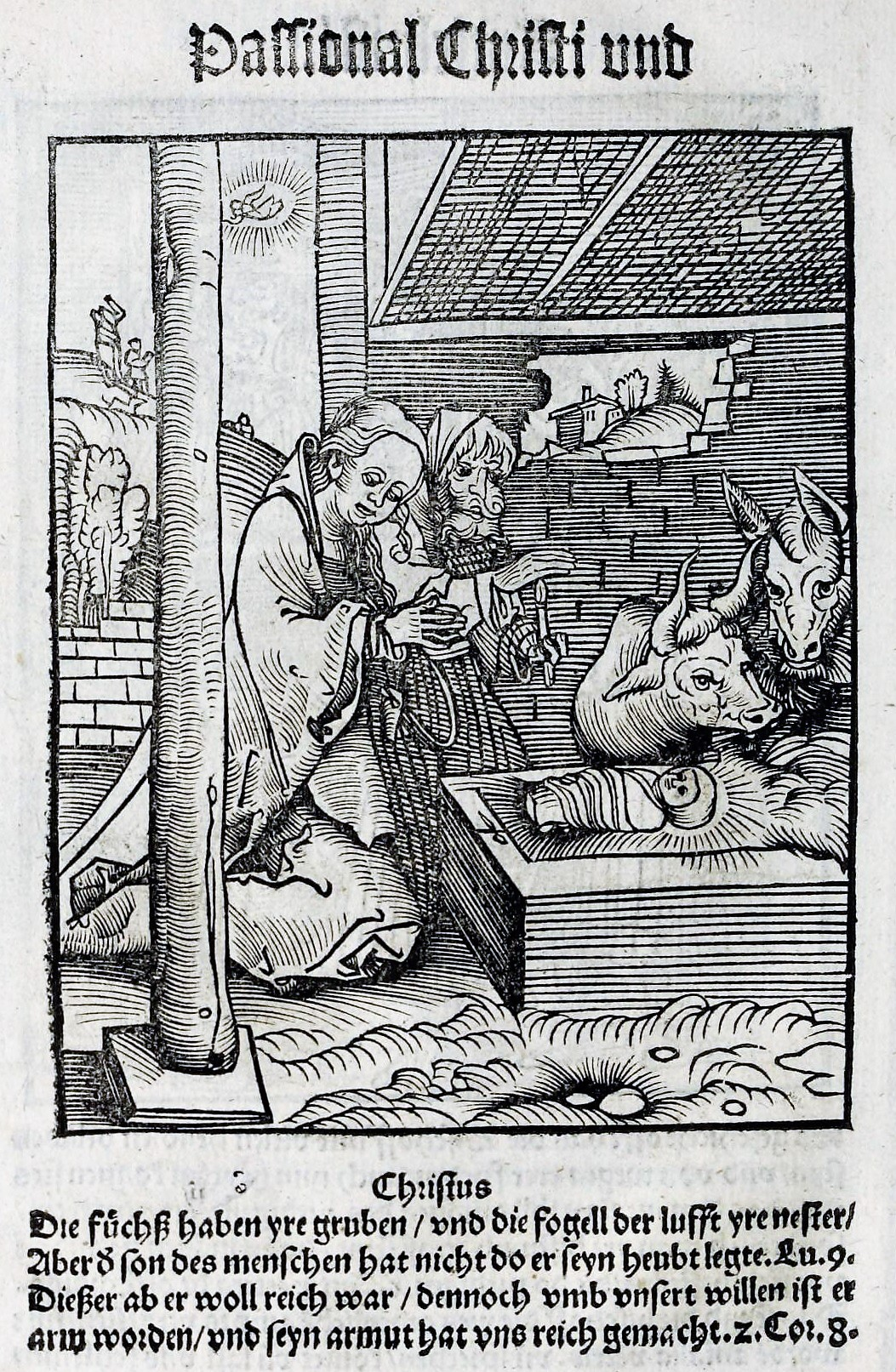
Christus, 1521

== Provenance ==
This painting was once in the collection of Richard von Kaufmann and was purchased by the museum from his estate in 1917. It was claimed by the Russians in 1945 and returned to the museum in 1955.
