= Adoration of the Shepherds (Josefa de Óbidos) =

Paintings by Josefa de Óbidos

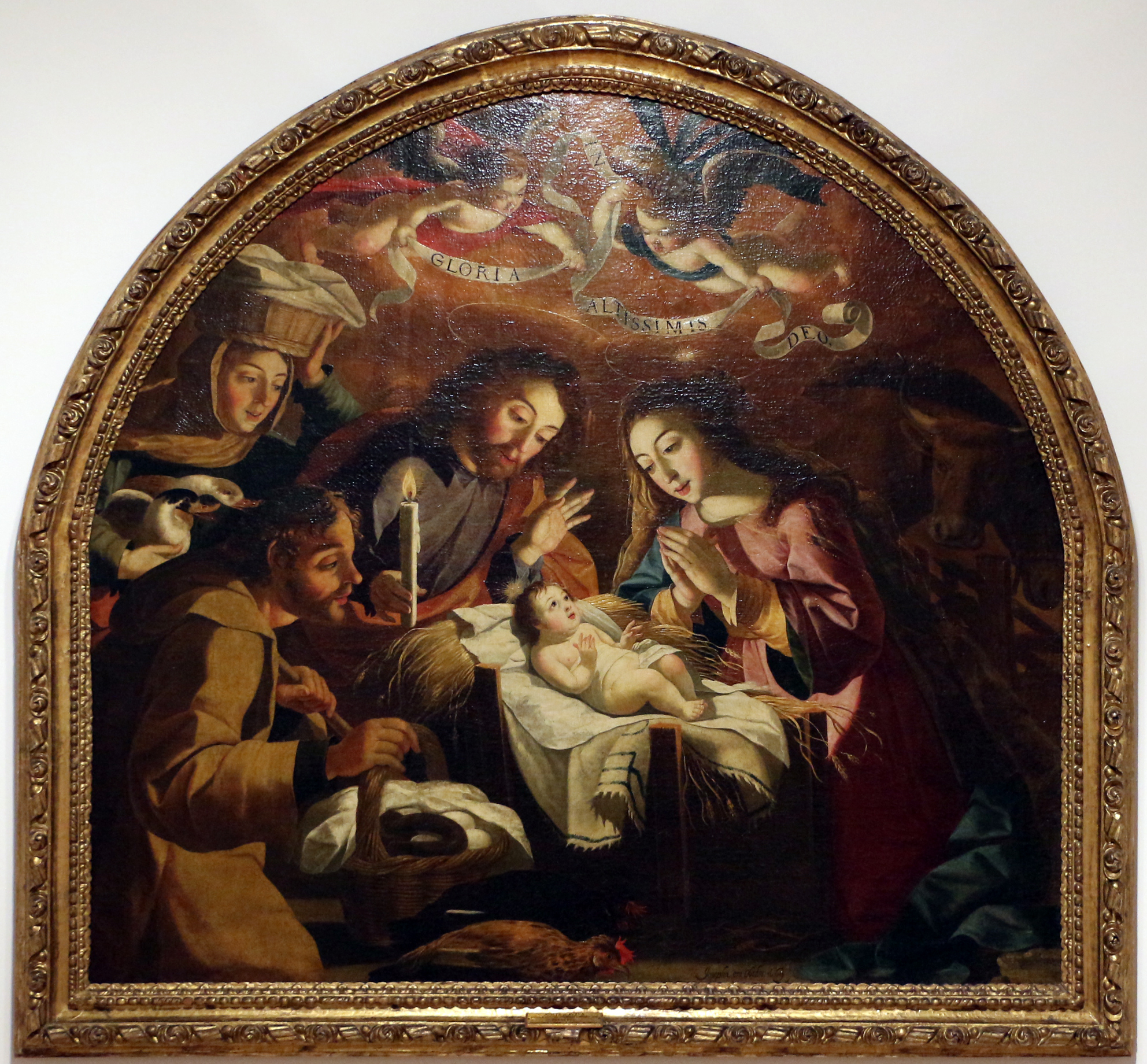
- Artist: Josefa de Óbidos
- Year: 1669
- Type: Oil on canvas
- Dimensions: 150 cm × 164 cm (59 in × 65 in)
- Location: National Museum of Ancient Art, Lisbon

Adoration of the Shepherds is an oil on canvas painting by the Portuguese artist Josefa de Óbidos, from 1669. It is held at the National Museum of Ancient Art, in Lisbon.

== Description ==
It is part of the religious painting that Josefa cultivated in his career. The current painting comes from the Church of Santa Maria Madalena, in Alcobaça.

The center of the composition depicts the Child Jesus in the manger, its focal point, with the presence of Saint Joseph, the Virgin Mary, and two other figures, at the left, a man and a woman, bringing him offerings. The scene is crowned by two angels holding a written ribbon, called a phylactery, with the inscription "DEO GLORIA ALTISSIMIS".

The donkey and the ox, traditionally present in the depictions of this episode, are seen in the right background, in a stable. The bearded men, kneeling, brings a basket of eggs, a chicken and a rooster, while the woman carries another basket on her head as she holds two ducks.
