= Adoration of the Shepherds (Santafede) =

Painting by Fabrizio Santafede in the National Museum of Capodimonte, Naples

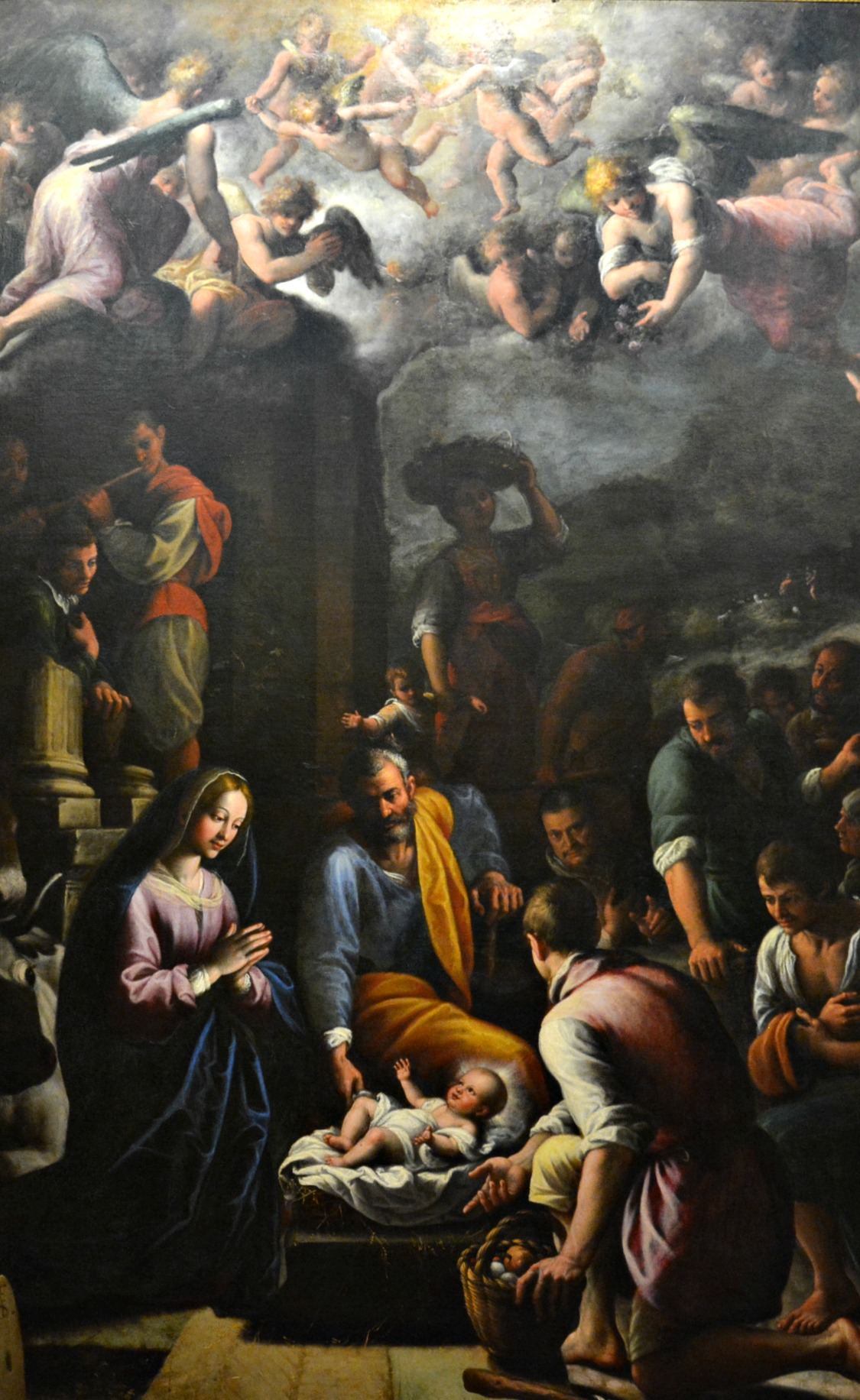

Adoration of the Shepherds or Nativity is a 1612-1614 oil on canvas painting by Fabrizio Santafede during his mature period for Maria Orsini's chapel in the Gesù e Maria church in Naples. It is now in the National Museum of Capodimonte.

== Sources ==
- Image
