= Adoration of the Shepherds (Ribera, Castellammare di Stabia) =

Painting by Jusepe de Ribera

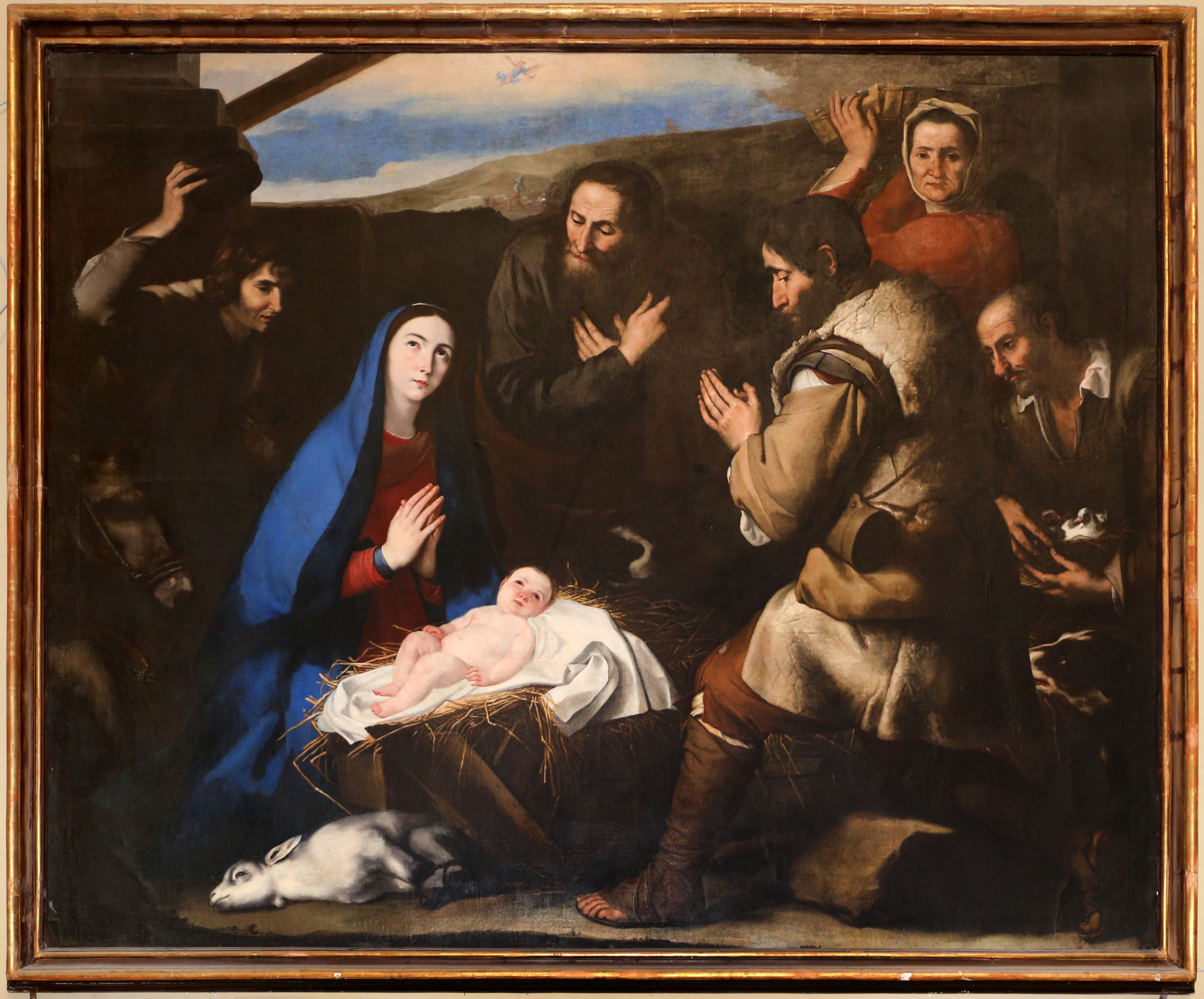
- Artist: Jusepe de Ribera
- Year: c.1650
- Medium: oil on canvas
- Location: Santissima Maria Assunta and San Catello Co-Cathedral, Castellammare di Stabia

Adoration of the Shepherds is an oil on canvas painting by the Spanish artist Jusepe de Ribera, executed c. 1650. It is now on display in the left transept of Santissima Maria Assunta and San Catello Co-Cathedral in Castellammare di Stabia.

It is almost identical to the artist's work on the same subject in Paris, apart that work being in portrait format and the Castellammare di Stabia work is in landscape format. Neither are securely dated and so it is unknown which is a copy of the other.
