= Adoration of the Shepherds (El Greco, Bucharest) =

Painting by El Greco

The Adoration of the Shepherds
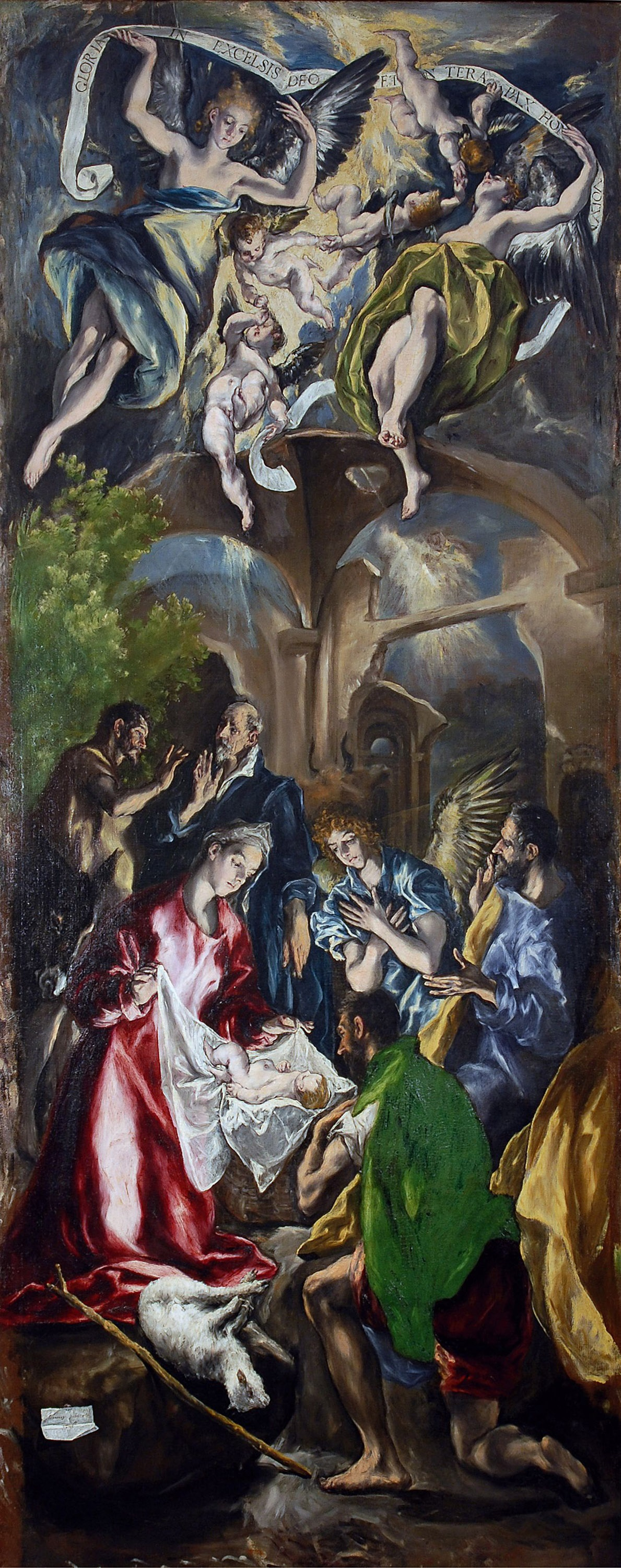
- Artist: El Greco
- Year: 1596
- Medium: Oil on canvas
- Dimensions: 364 cm × 137 cm (143 in × 54 in)
- Location: National Museum of Art of Romania; Bucharest

The Adoration of the Shepherds is a painting of the traditional subject which was painted by El Greco in 1596. It is in the European painting collection of the National Museum of Art of Romania. This unusually tall painting is a work in the group of equally tall paintings which the artist made as part of his 1596 commission known as the Doña María de Aragón Altarpiece for the Colegio de Dona Maria de Aragón in a building that is now the location of Palacio del Senado in Madrid. El Greco's signature, in Greek, may be seen on the paper in the lower left corner.

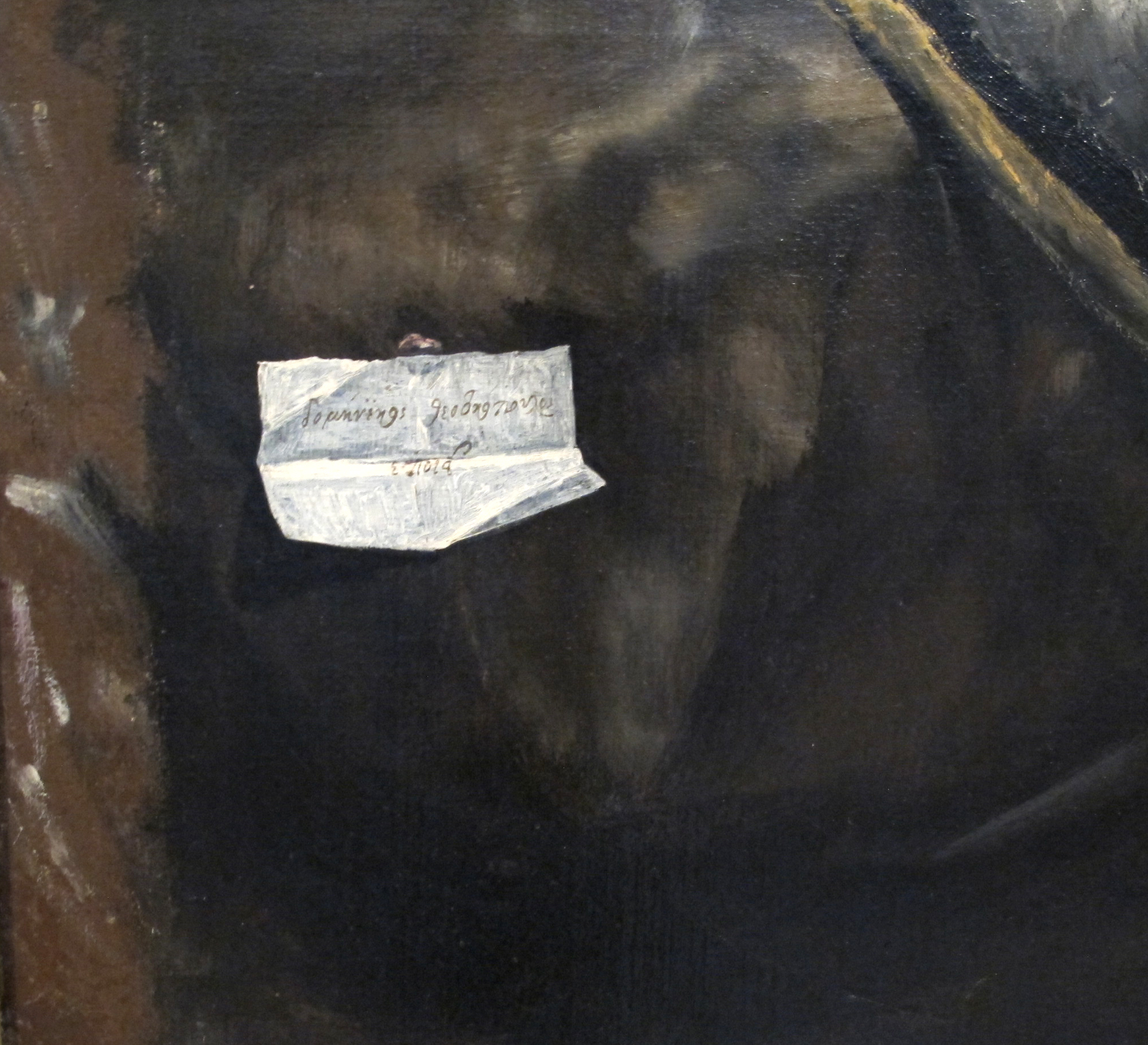
Trompe l'oeil paper label with Greek signature, lower left

According to surviving documentation, delivery was promised by Easter of 1599, but papers show it was shipped from Toledo to Madrid in 1600 and final payment was made for the "high altar" in September of that year.

Today we know nothing about El Greco's design of the high altar, the height of original display of the paintings nor who commissioned them, since the altarpiece was deconstructed during the French occupation of Spain under Joseph Bonaparte. The original commission consisted of six paintings and six sculptures which visually embodied the idea of the Incarnation of the Son of God, reflecting the title of the chapel as well as being the subject of many theological debates in contemporary Spain. It was dismantled in the early 19th century and the sculptures are lost, while the other five paintings were moved to the Prado Museum.

== Two worlds shown in one painting ==
Distortion of body characterizes the Adoration of the Shepherds like many altarpiece paintings of El Greco. Sometimes these were installed at floor level and sometimes high above the viewer, so it is not known if viewing perspective was taken into account. Like earlier designs El Greco made of the same subject, the secular world is shown in the lower half, and the divine world is shown in the upper half. Due to the difficulties of displaying such tall paintings, some of these tall masterpieces by El Greco were cut in half, leaving fragments in various collections such as the heavenly fragment Concert of Angels, today in Athens and the secular fragment Opening of the Fifth Seal, today in New York.

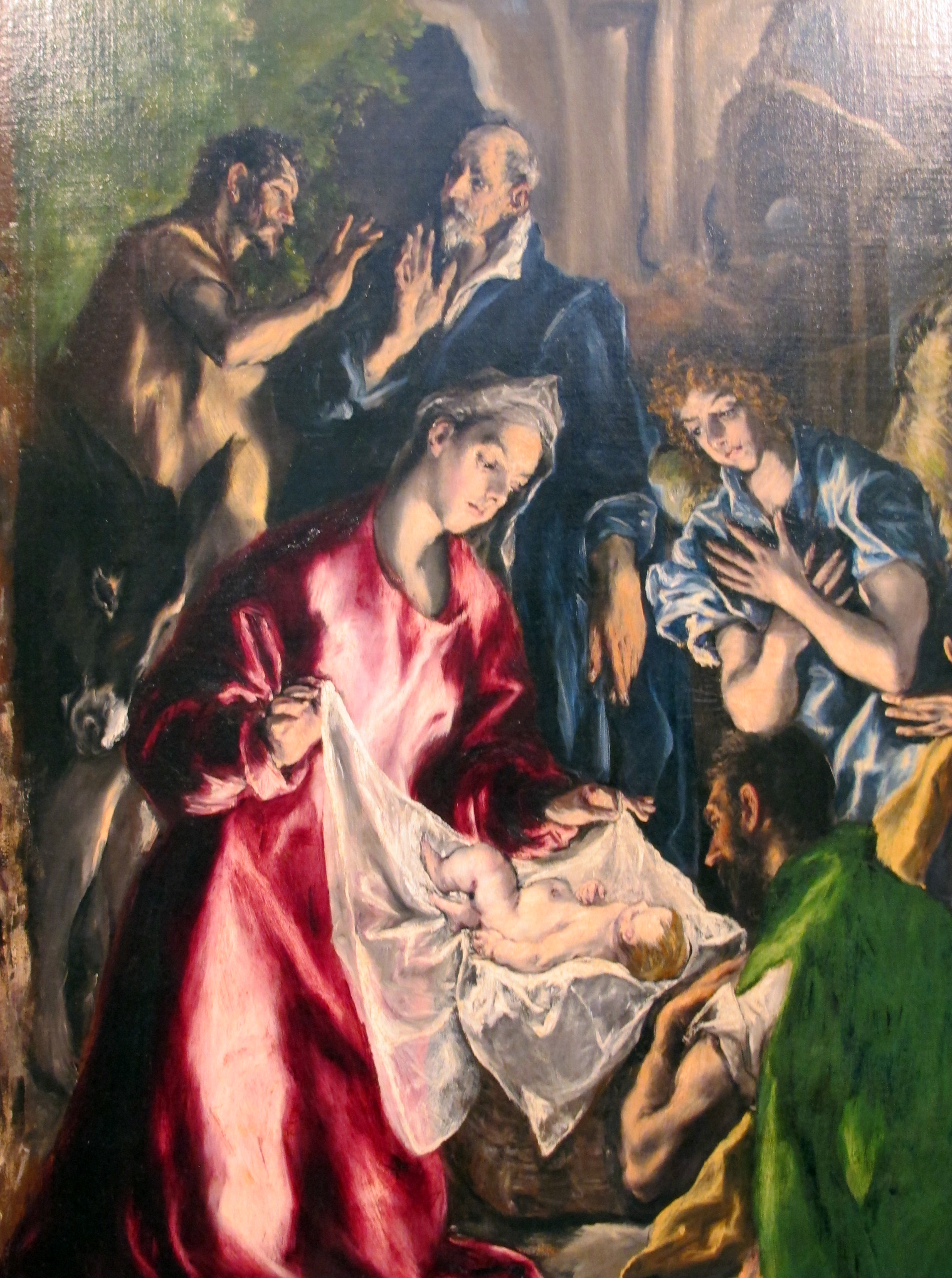
Detail of the secular world, with a mother opening a diaper to display her child, whose light is reflected on all of the faces.

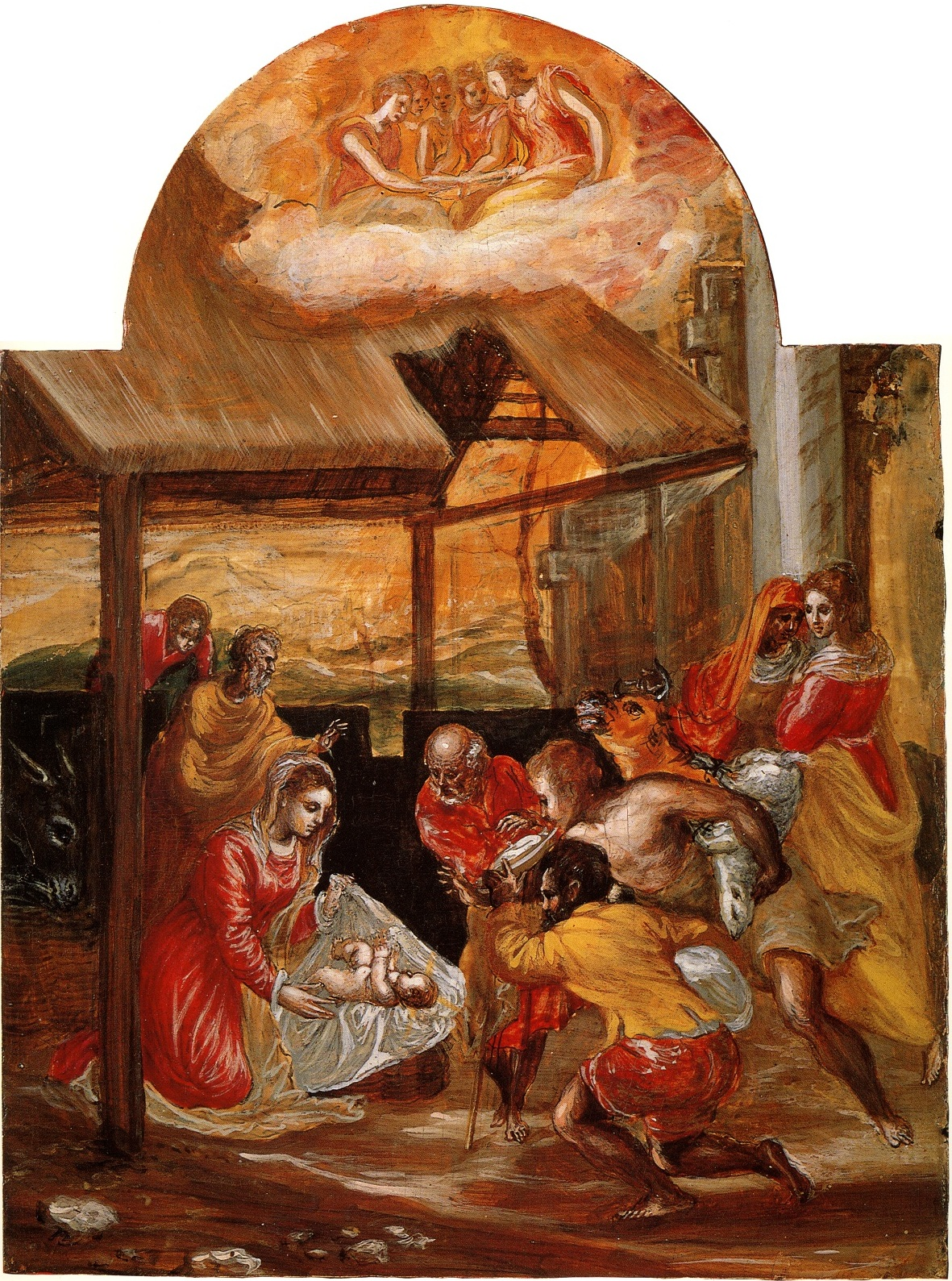
Earliest known version in 1568 by El Greco for the Modena Triptych

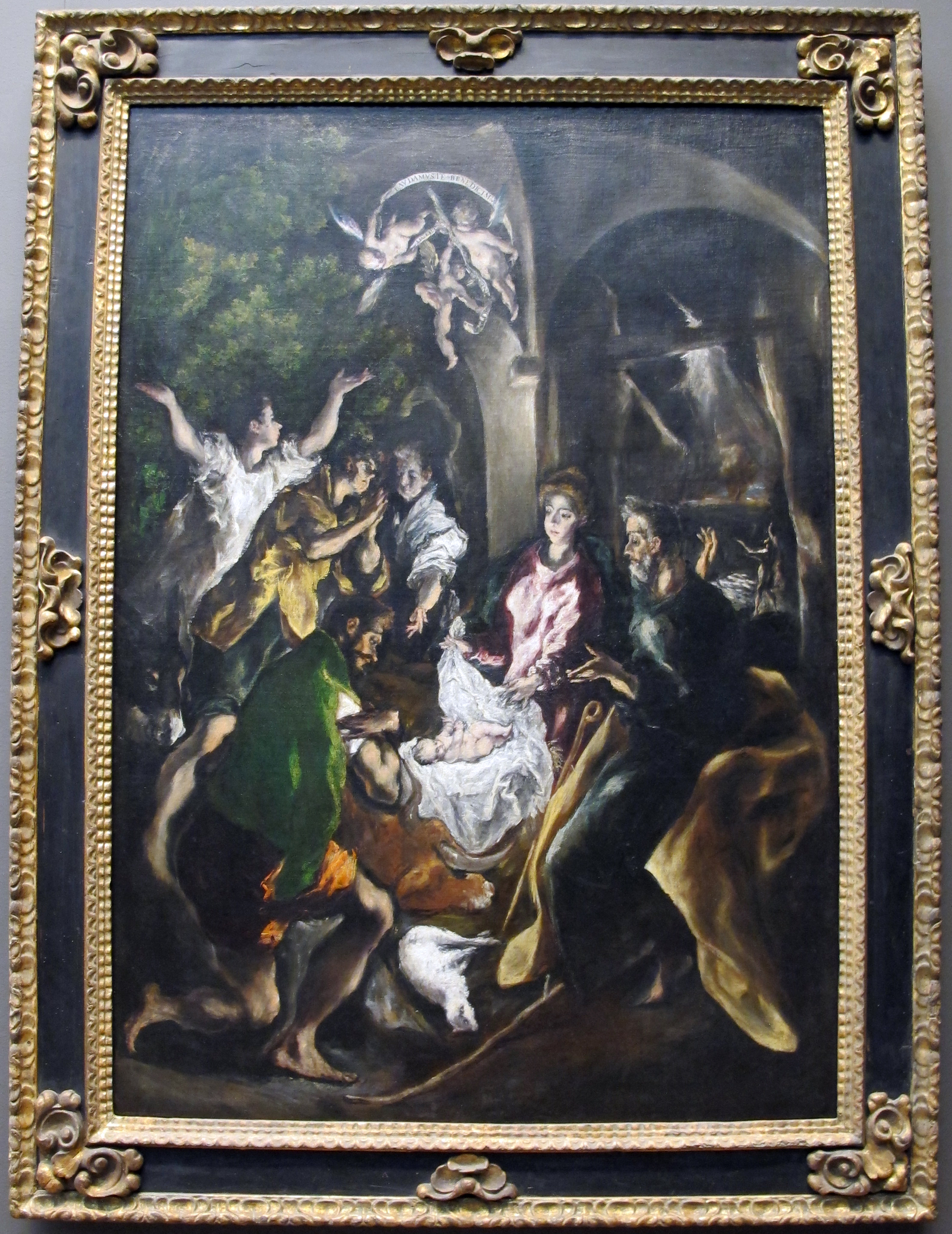
Same theme by El Greco in 1597, today in the Metropolitan Museum of Art

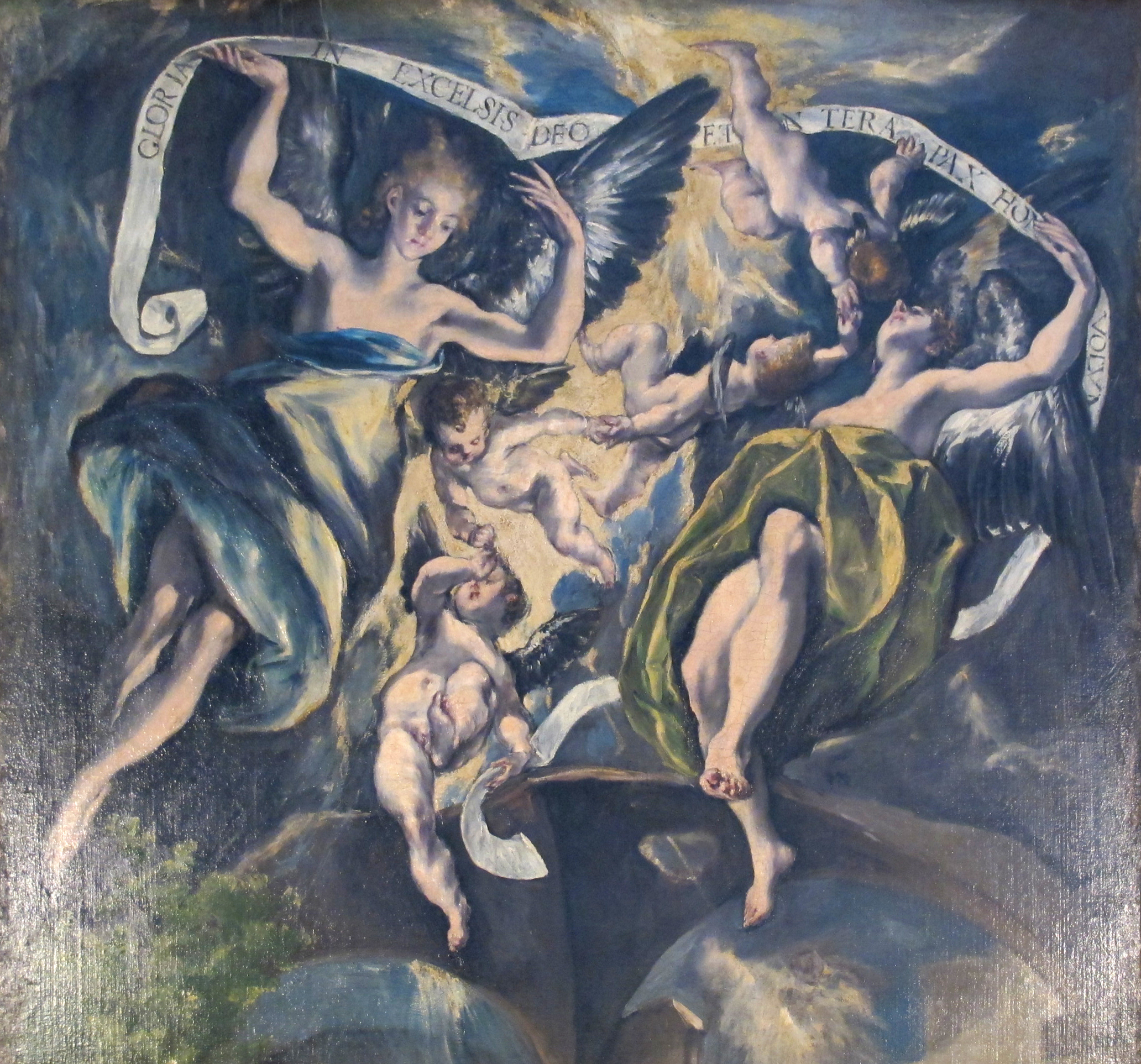
Detail of heaven, where floating angels hold the Latin text Gloria in excelsis Deo

== Other versions and provenance ==
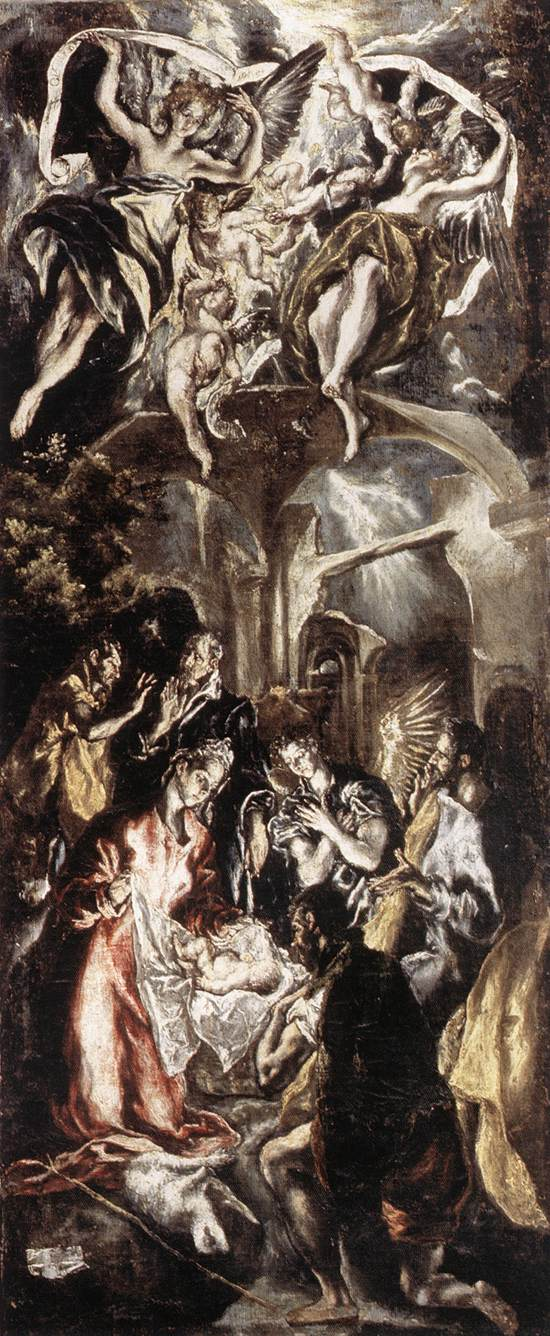
Smaller copy in Rome

El Greco's nativity scenes were very popular throughout his career, and six were listed in the 1621 inventory of his son Jorge Manuel's possessions. This explains how this painting came to be separated from the rest of the altarpiece, as it was possibly the most popular subject. A smaller copy of this painting painted in 1598 is in the collection of the Galleria Nazionale d'Arte Antica.

In 1581 Philip III of Spain granted land for the building of this chapter of nuns of the Order of St. Augustine, which was named after its commissioner, Dona Maria de Aragón, a lady-in-waiting to the queen, Dona Ana de Austria. She negotiated initial delivery of the altarpiece in 1596, but died sometime before payment in September of 1600. El Greco had promised delivery by Easter 1599, but only delivered in July 1600, whereupon it was appraised by Dona Maria de Aragón's executors in August 1600. The altarpiece was intact until 1808, but after deconstruction it was no longer on show there and on 17 August 1836 Baron Taylor purchased it for King Louis Philippe, at whose sale 21 May 1853, lot number #108, it subsequently went to the brothers Émile Péreire (1800-1875) and Isaac Péreire (1806-1880), Paris; from their sale, Hôtel Drouot, Paris, 30–31 January 1868, lot number 31, it went to Félix Bamberg, consul of Messina, at whose sale in 1879, it was purchased for the Royal Palace, Sinaia.

== See also ==
- List of works by El Greco
