= Adoration of the Shepherds (El Greco, Valencia) =

Painting by El Greco

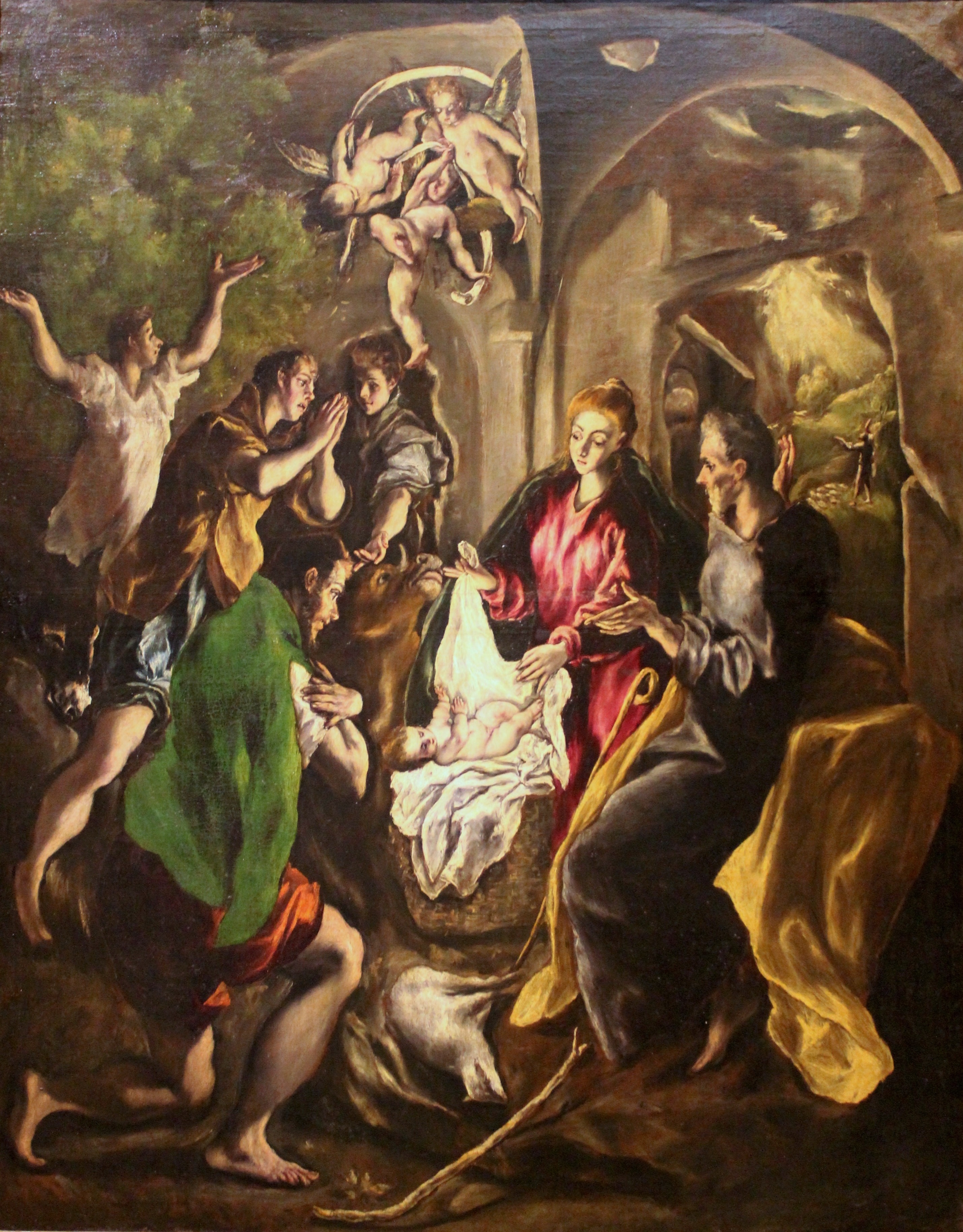

Adoration of the Shepherds is a 1602 oil on canvas painting by El Greco. According to Harold Wethey the artist and his studio produced nine works on that subject. It is now in the Museo del Patriarca in Valencia. It appears in Wethey's catalogue raisonné as no. 26 and Tiziana Frati's as 133-a.

It has always been in the Real Colegio Seminario del Corpus Christi, though it is unknown whether it entered it after its founder Juan de Ribera's death or later. It may have been given by Don Pedro Laso de la Vega (1559–1637), who collected works by El Greco, since Don Pedro's wife was related to Juan de Ribera, or by Friar Isidoro Aliaga Martínez, Juan de Ribera's successor as Archbishop of Valencia and well-connected with the Archdiocese of Toledo.

== See also ==
- List of works by El Greco

== Bibliography (in Spanish) ==
- Álvarez Lopera, José (2014). El Greco. La obra esencial. Madrid: Sílex.
- Frati, Tiziana (1970). La obra pictórica completa de El Greco. Barcelona-Milano: Noguer Rizzoli.
- Gudiol, José (1982). Doménikos Theotokópoulos, El Greco, 1541-1614. Barcelona: Ediciones Polígrafa.
- Wethey, Harold Edwin (1967). El Greco y su escuela. Vol. II. Translated by Carlos Cid Priego. Madrid: Guadarrama.
