= Igreja da Graça (Coimbra) =

Church in Coimbra, Portugal

Coordinates: 40.213285°N 8.430932°W

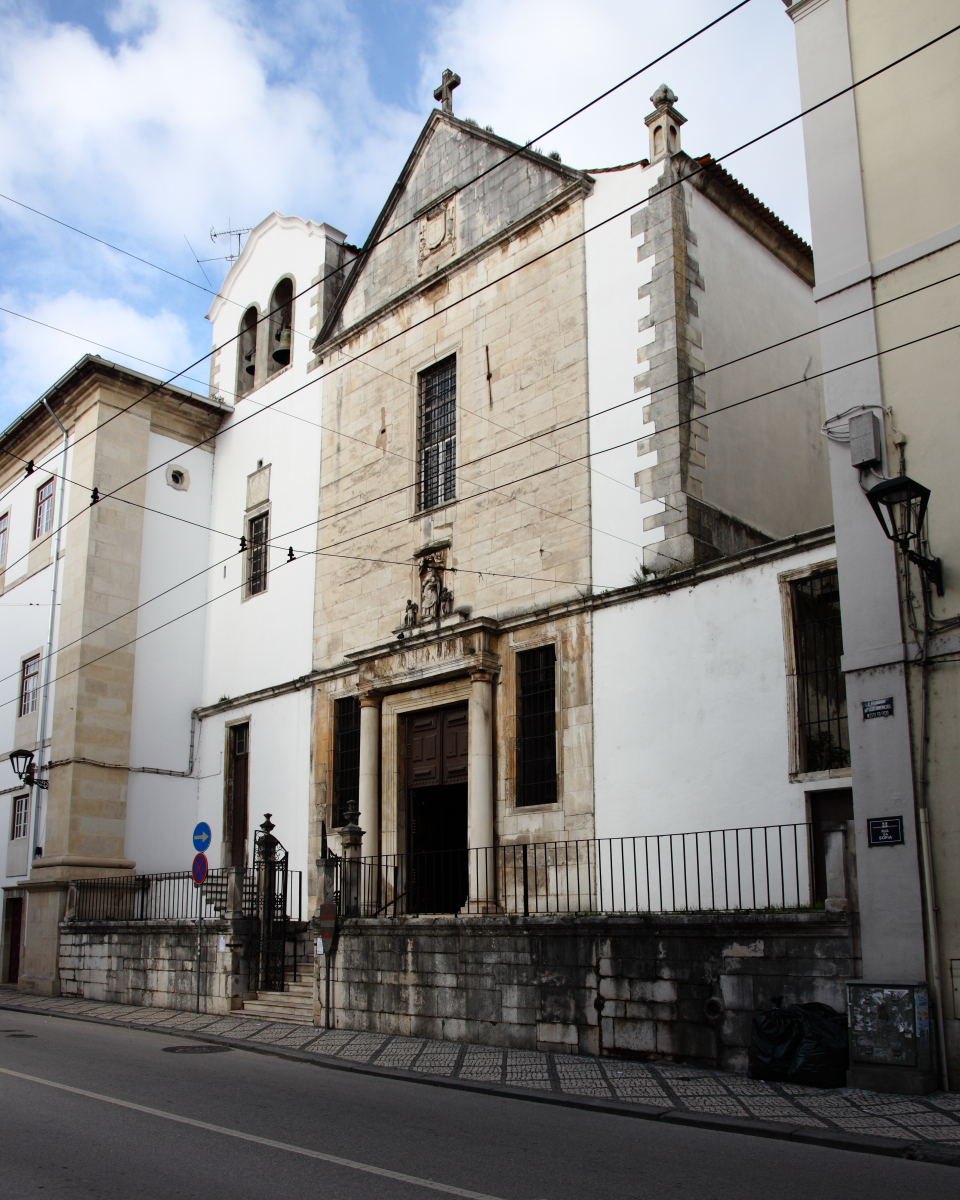
Facade of Igreja da Graça, Coimbra

Igreja da Graça is a church in Portugal. It is classified as a National Monument.
