= List of works by Guido Reni =

This incomplete list of works by Guido Reni contains paintings and drawings in a variety of genres. Titles and dates often vary by source.

== List of works by year ==
Image	Title	Date	Dimensions	Collection	Medium
	Self-portrait	c. 1602–3	64.5 x 52 cm		Oil on canvas
	The Martyrdom of Saint Catherine	c. 1606	277 x 195 cm	Diocesan Museum (Albenga)	Oil on canvas
	Massacre of the Innocents	1611	268 × 170 cm	Pinacoteca Nazionale di Bologna (Note: Created in 1611 for the Basilica of San Domenico in Bologna, but now in the Pinacoteca Nazionale in that same city.) (Bologna)	Oil on canvas
	Charity	c. 1611	115 x 90 cm	Galleria Palatina (Florence)	Oil on canvas
	Aurora	1614	2.8 x 7 m	Palazzo Pallavicini-Rospigliosi (Rome)	Fresco
	Saint Sebastian	c. 1615	129 x 98 cm	Capitoline Museums (Rome)	Oil on canvas
	Four Seasons	c. 1617–1620		Museo di Capodimonte (Naples)	
	Risen Christ	1620	228 x 138 cm	MUŻA (Valletta)	Oil on canvas
	The Flight into Egypt	c. 1622		Girolamini (Naples)	
	Jesus Meets John the Baptist	c. 1622		Girolamini (Naples)	Oil on canvas
	Saint Francis in Ecstasy	c. 1622	198 x 133 cm	Girolamini (Naples)	Oil on canvas
	Atalanta and Hippomenes	1620–1625	191 x 264 cm	Museo di Capodimonte (Naples)	Oil on canvas
	Cupids Fighting Putti	c. 1625	120 x 152 cm	Doria Pamphilj Gallery (Rome)	Oil on canvas
	The Abduction of Helen	1628–1629	253 x 265 cm	Louvre (Paris)	Oil on canvas
	Charity	1629–1630	137 x 106 cm	Metropolitan Museum of Art (New York City)	Oil on canvas
	Saint Sebastian	c. 1625	192 x 155 cm	Auckland Art Gallery (Auckland)	Oil on canvas
	Annunciation	1621	267 x 164 cm	Louvre (Paris)	Oil on canvas
	Annunciation	1629	319 x 221 cm	Louvre (Paris)	Oil on canvas
	Pala della Peste	1631–1632	382 x 242 cm	Pinacoteca Nazionale di Bologna (Bologna)	Oil on silk
	Saint Matthew and the Angel	c. 1635	85 x 68 cm	Santa Maria della Concezione dei Cappuccini (Rome)	Oil on canvas
	Self-portrait	c. 1635	48.5 x 37 cm	Uffizi (Florence)	Oil on canvas
	Assumption of the Virgin	1627	238 x 150 cm	Castelfranco Emilia (Modena)	Oil on canvas
	Assumption of the Virgin	1637	242 x 161 cm	Museum of Fine Arts of Lyon (Lyon)	Oil on canvas
	Assumption of the Virgin	c. 1638–1639	295 x 208 cm	Bavarian State Painting Collections	Oil on canvas
	Saint Sebastian	c. 1620–1639	170 x 131 cm	Dulwich Picture Gallery (London)	Oil on canvas
	Fortuna with a Crown	1620s or 1630s	165 x 135 cm	Accademia di San Luca (Rome)	Oil on canvas
	Fortuna with a Purse	1636		Private collection	
	The Rape of Europa	1637–1629	177 x 129 cm	National Gallery (London)	Oil on canvas
	Polyphemus	1639–1640	52 x 63 cm	Capitoline Museums (Rome)	Oil on canvas
	Saint Joseph with the Christ Child	c. 1625–1630		Diocesan Museum (Milan)	Oil on canvas
	Saint Joseph with the Christ Child	1635	126 x 101 cm	Hermitage Museum (Saint Petersburg)	Oil on canvas
	Saint Joseph with the Christ Child	c. 1640	89 x 72 cm	Museum of Fine Arts (Houston)	Oil on canvas
	Adoration of the Shepherds	c. 1642	485 x 350 cm	Certosa di San Martino (Naples)	Oil on canvas

== See also ==
- Bolognese School
