= Gallinari =

Gallinari is an Italian surname. Notable people with the surname include:

- Danilo Gallinari (born 1988), Italian basketball player
- Pietro Gallinari (1600s–1640), Italian painter
- Prospero Gallinari (1951–2013), Italian terrorist
- Vittorio Gallinari (born 1958), Italian basketball player and sports agent, father of Danilo Gallinari
