= Giulio Dinarelli =

Italian painter

Giulio or Giuliano Dinarelli (1629–1671) was an Italian painter of the Baroque period, active in Bologna. He was a pupil of Guido Reni.
