= Bartolomeo Marescotti =

Italian painter

Bartolomeo Marescotti (c. 1590-1630) was an Italian painter active during the Baroque, mainly in his native Bologna. He was a pupil and close follower of Guido Reni. He died during a plague epidemic.
