= Four Seasons (Reni) =

Painting by Guido Reni

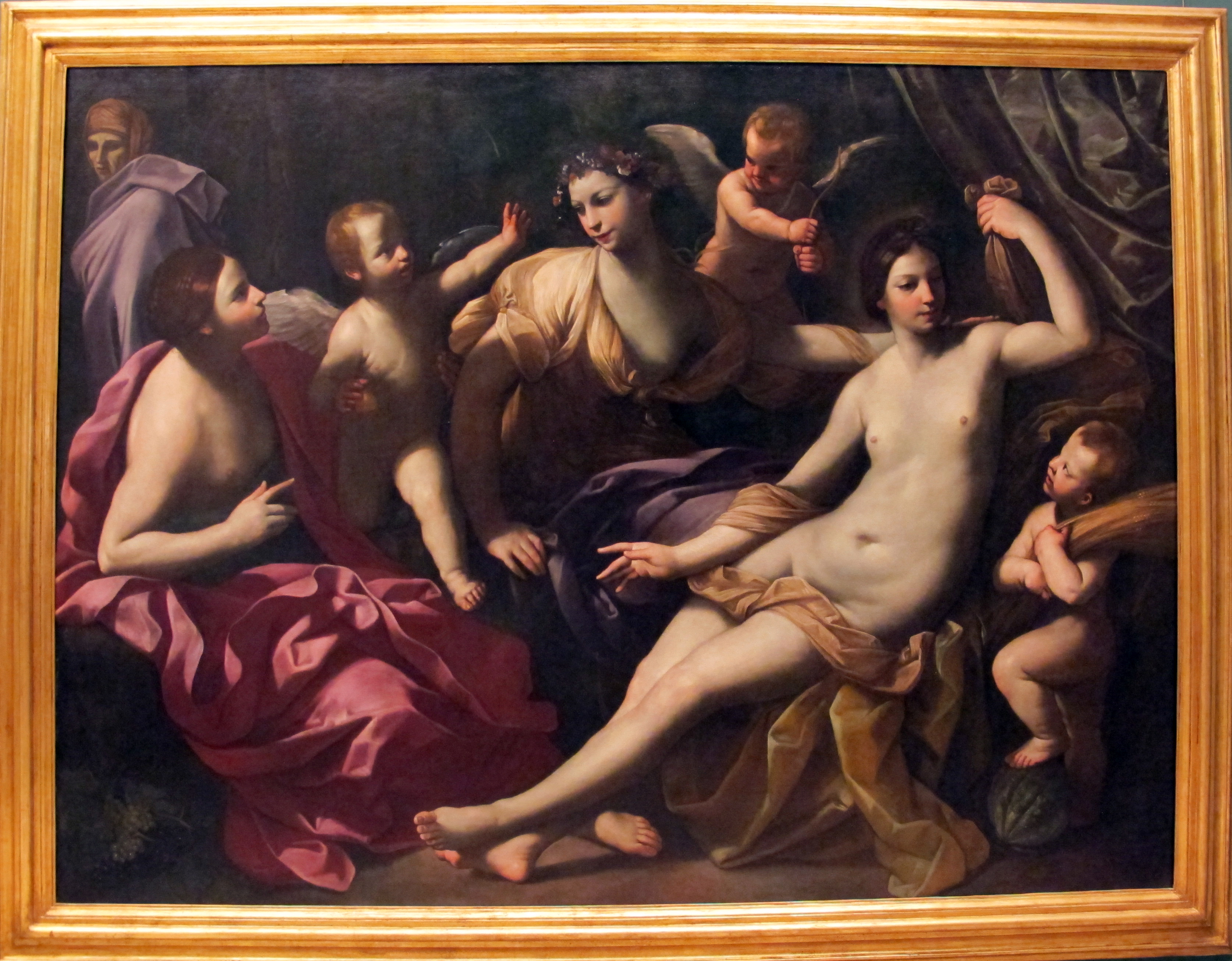
Four Seasons (c. 1617–1620) by Guido Reni

Four Seasons is a c. 1617-1620 oil on canvas painting by Guido Reni, now in the Museo di Capodimonte in Naples. A 1618-1620 studio copy of the work is now in the Kunsthistorisches Museum in Vienna.

A print by Franz Valentin Durmer from the late 18th or early 19th century, based on the painting is held in the permanent collection of the Victoria and Albert Museum.

== History ==
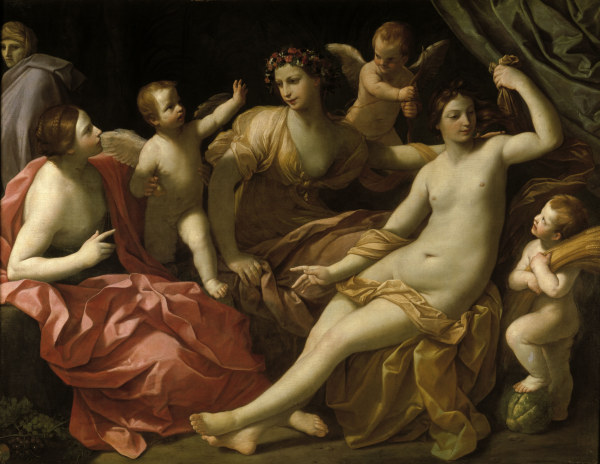
The studio version
