= Cupids Fighting Putti =

Painting by Guido Reni

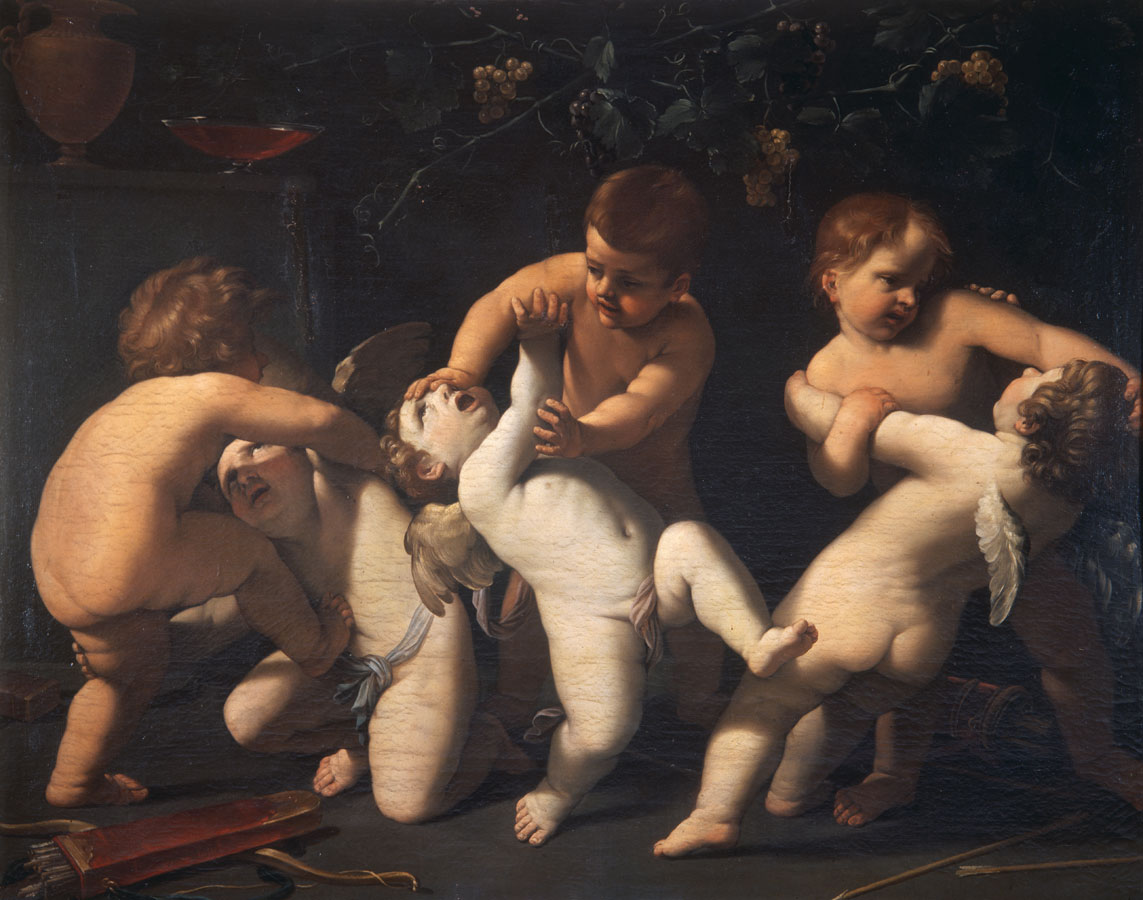
'Cupids Fighting Putti (c. 1625) by Guido Reni

Cupids Fighting Putti is a c. 1625 oil on canvas painting by Guido Reni, now in the Galleria Doria Pamphilj, in Rome.

== History ==
The painting was probably influenced by his constant disputes with the papal treasurer whilst producing a painting for the Quirinal Palace - Reni was accused of being slow, arrogant and stubborn and out of disgust for the treasurer he left Rome without finishing the work or saying farewell to the pope. Whilst working on a fresco for the church of San Domenico in Bologna he was visited by a cardinal legate on behalf of the pope but refused his request to return to Rome to complete the decoration of Santa Maria Maggiore. The cardinal was appalled and attempted to imprison Reni, but he escaped and went into hiding, planning to leave Italy for the royal court in France or Spain. Reni's friend and protector Marquis Facchinetti convinced the cardinal-legate of Bologna to annul the sentence and persuaded Reni to return to Rome and accept the commission entrusted to him by the pope. In gratitude for his assistance, the artist painted Cupids Fighting Putti and gave the work to the Marquis. One of several copies of it is now in the National Museum, Kraków.
