= Guido Reni =

Italian Baroque painter (1575–1642)

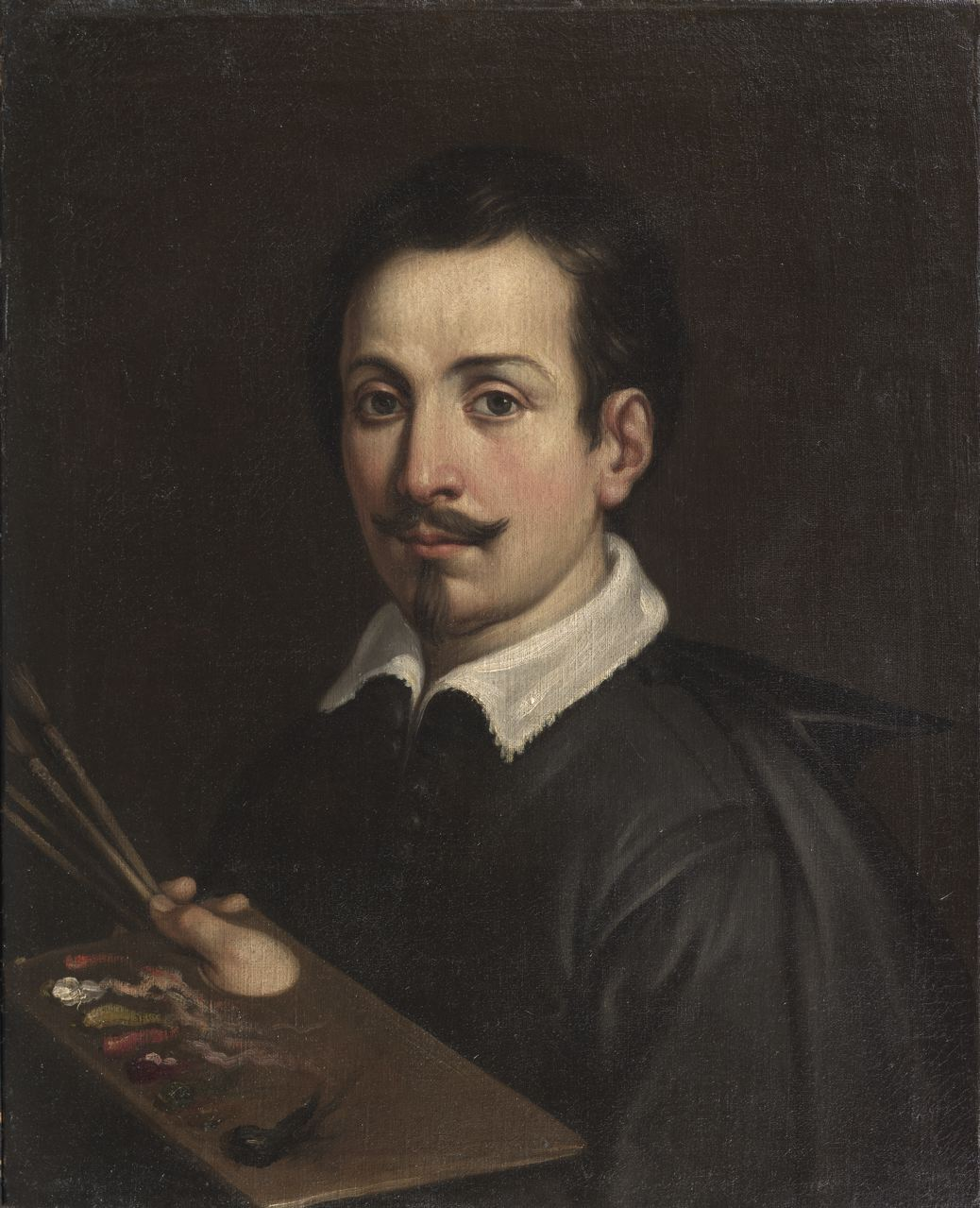
- Self portrait, c. 1602
- Born: 4 November 1575; Bologna, Papal States
- Died: 18 August 1642 (aged 66); Bologna, Papal States
- Known for: Painting
- Movement: Baroque

Guido Reni (Italian pronunciation: [ˈɡwiːdo ˈrɛːni]; 4 November 1575 – 18 August 1642) was an Italian Baroque painter, although his works showed a classical manner, similar to Simon Vouet, Nicolas Poussin, and Philippe de Champaigne. He painted primarily religious works, but also mythological and allegorical subjects. Active in Rome, Naples, and his native Bologna, he became the dominant figure in the Bolognese School that emerged under the influence of the Carracci.

== Biography ==
Born in Bologna into a family of musicians, Guido Reni was the only child of Daniele Reni and Ginevra Pozzi. Apprenticed at the age of nine to the Bolognese studio of Denis Calvaert, he was soon joined in that studio by Albani and Domenichino.

When Reni was about twenty years old, the three Calvaert pupils migrated to the rising rival studio, named Accademia degli Incamminati (Academy of the "newly embarked", or progressives), led by Ludovico Carracci. They went on to form the nucleus of a prolific and successful school of Bolognese painters who followed Ludovico's cousin, Annibale Carracci, to Rome.

Reni completed commissions for his first altarpieces while in the Carracci academy. He left the academy by 1598, after an argument with Ludovico Carracci over unpaid work. Around this time, he made his first prints, a series commemorating Pope Clement VIII's visit to Bologna in 1598.

=== Work in Rome ===
By late 1601, Reni and Albani had moved to Rome to work with the teams led by Annibale Carracci in fresco decoration of the Farnese Palace. By 1604–05 he received an independent commission for an altarpiece of the Crucifixion of St. Peter. After returning briefly to Bologna, he went back to Rome to become one of the premier painters during the papacy of Pope Paul V (Borghese); between 1607 and 1614, he became one of the painters most patronized by the Borghese family.

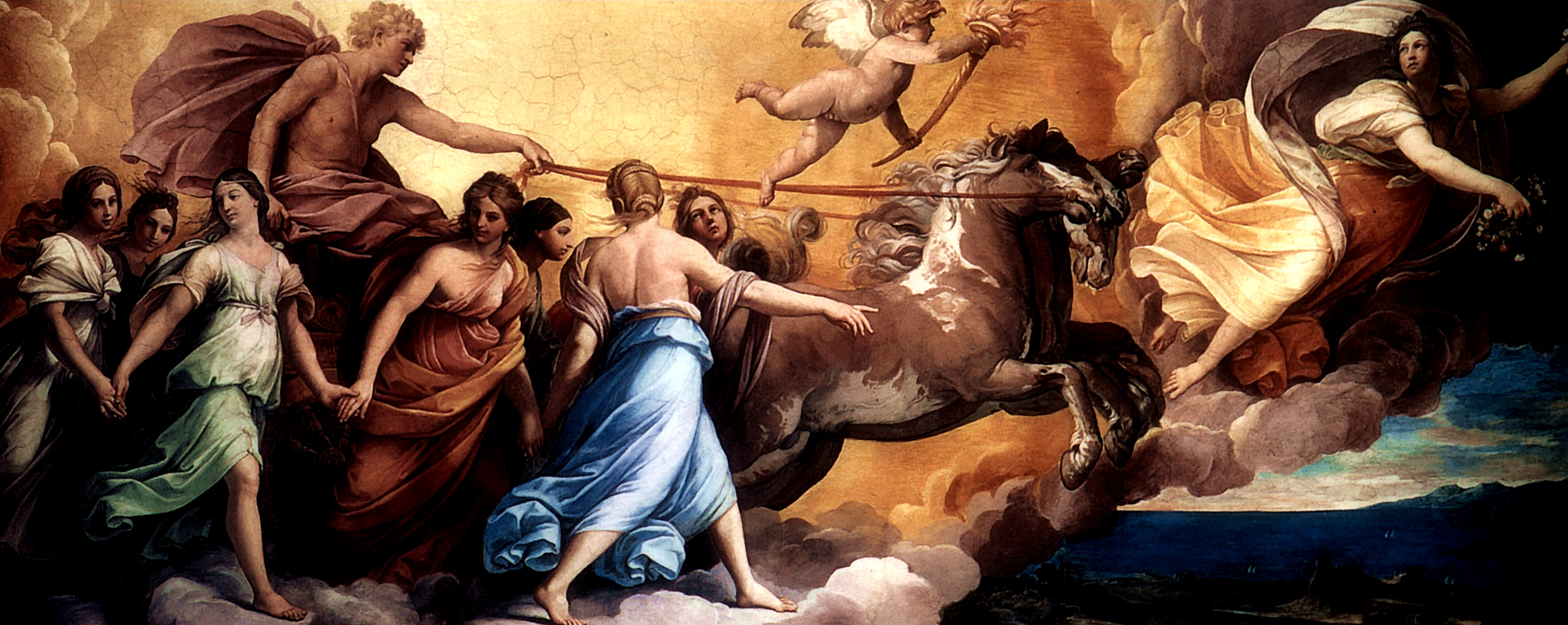
Guido Reni – L'Aurora

Located in Casino dell' Aurora on the grounds of the Palazzo Pallavicini-Rospigliosi, is Reni's fresco masterpiece, L'Aurora. The building was originally a pavilion commissioned by Cardinal Scipione Borghese; the rear portion overlooks the Piazza Montecavallo and Palazzo del Quirinale.

The massive fresco is framed in quadri riportati and depicts Apollo in his Chariot preceded by Dawn (Aurora) bringing light to the world. The work is restrained in classicism, copying poses from Roman sarcophagi, and showing far more simplicity and restraint than Carracci's riotous Triumph of Bacchus and Ariadne in the Farnese.

In this painting, Reni allies himself more with the sterner Cavaliere d'Arpino, Lanfranco, and Albani "School" of mytho-historic painting, and less with the more crowded frescoes characteristic of Pietro da Cortona. There is little concession to perspective, and the vibrantly coloured style is antithetical to the tenebrism of Caravaggio's followers. Documents show that Reni was paid 247 scudi and 54 baiocchi upon completion of his work on 24 September 1616.

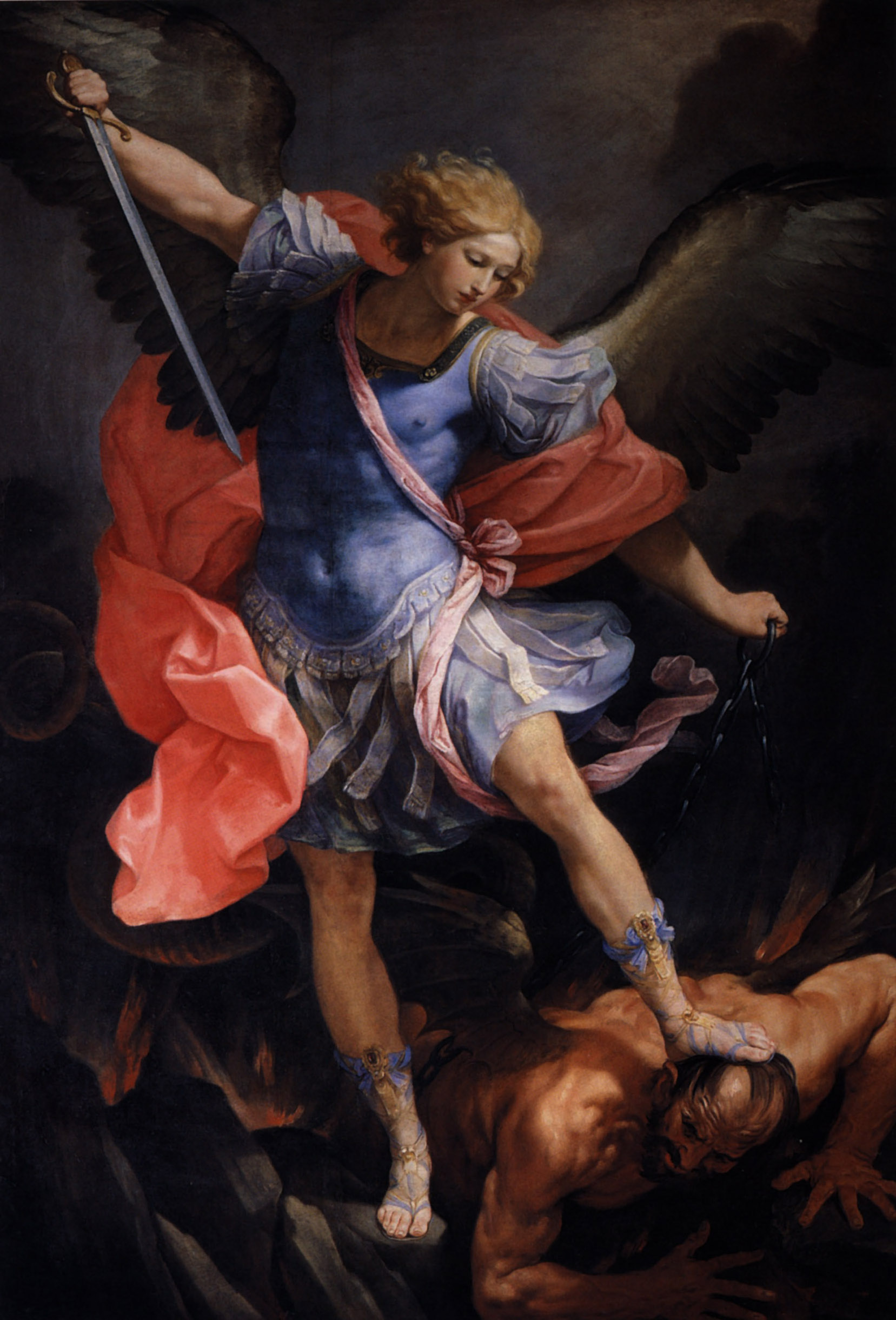
St Michael Archangel, 1636. The Archangel Michael trampling Satan wears a late-Roman military cloak and cuirass. Held in Santa Maria della Concezione dei Cappuccini, Rome.

In 1630, the Barberini family of Pope Urban VIII commissioned from Reni a painting of the Archangel Michael for the church of Santa Maria della Concezione dei Cappuccini. The painting, completed in 1636, gave rise to an old legend that Reni had represented Satan—crushed under St Michael's foot—with the facial features of Cardinal Giovanni Battista Pamphilj in revenge for a slight.

Reni also frescoed the Paoline Chapel of Santa Maria Maggiore in Rome as well as the Aldobrandini wings of the Vatican. According to rumour, the pontifical chapel of Montecavallo (Chapel of the Annunciation) was assigned to Reni to paint. However, because he felt underpaid by the papal ministers, the artist left Rome once again for Bologna, leaving the role of the pre-eminent artist in Rome to Domenichino.

=== Work in Naples and return to Bologna ===
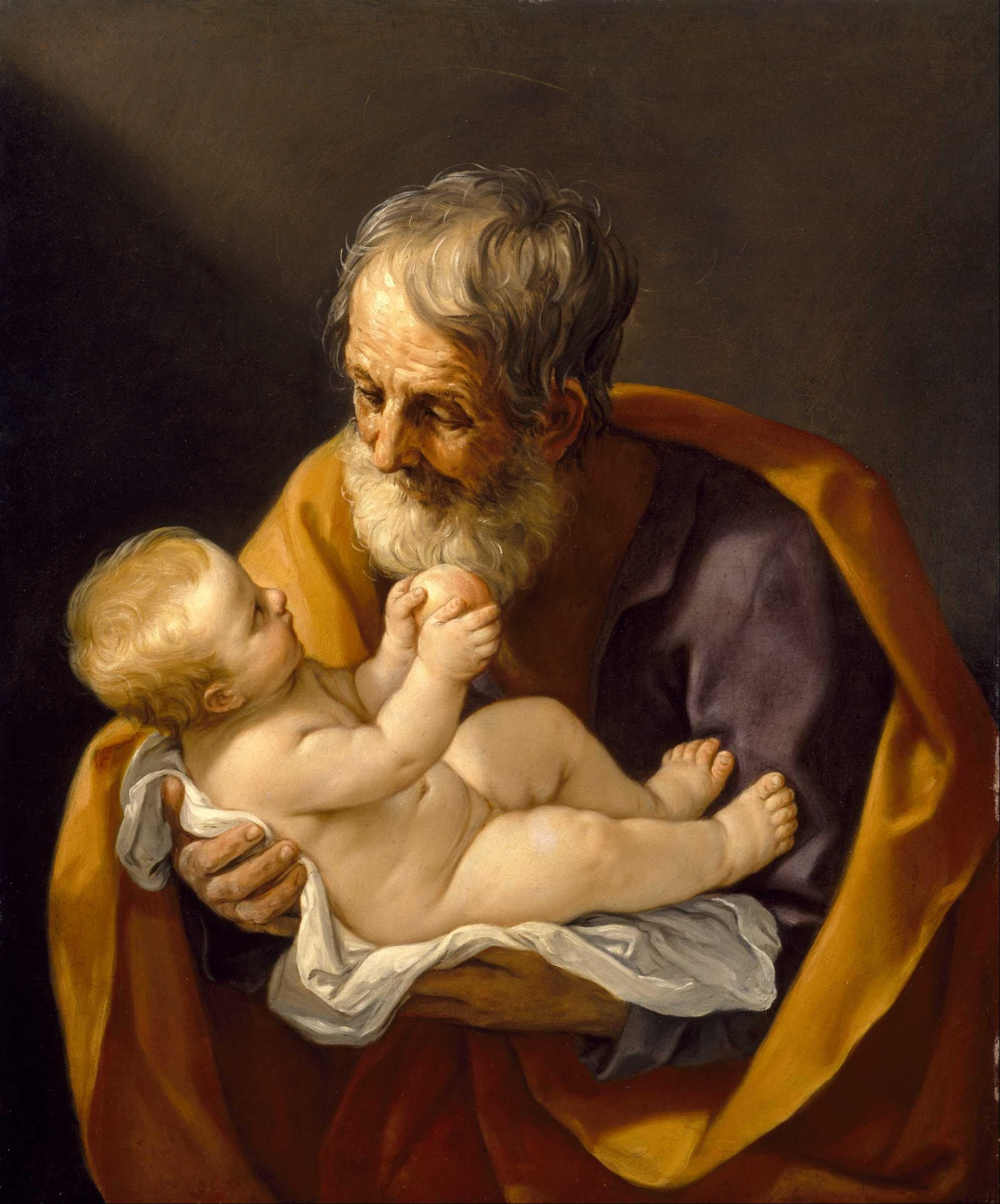
Saint Joseph and the Christ Child, 1640

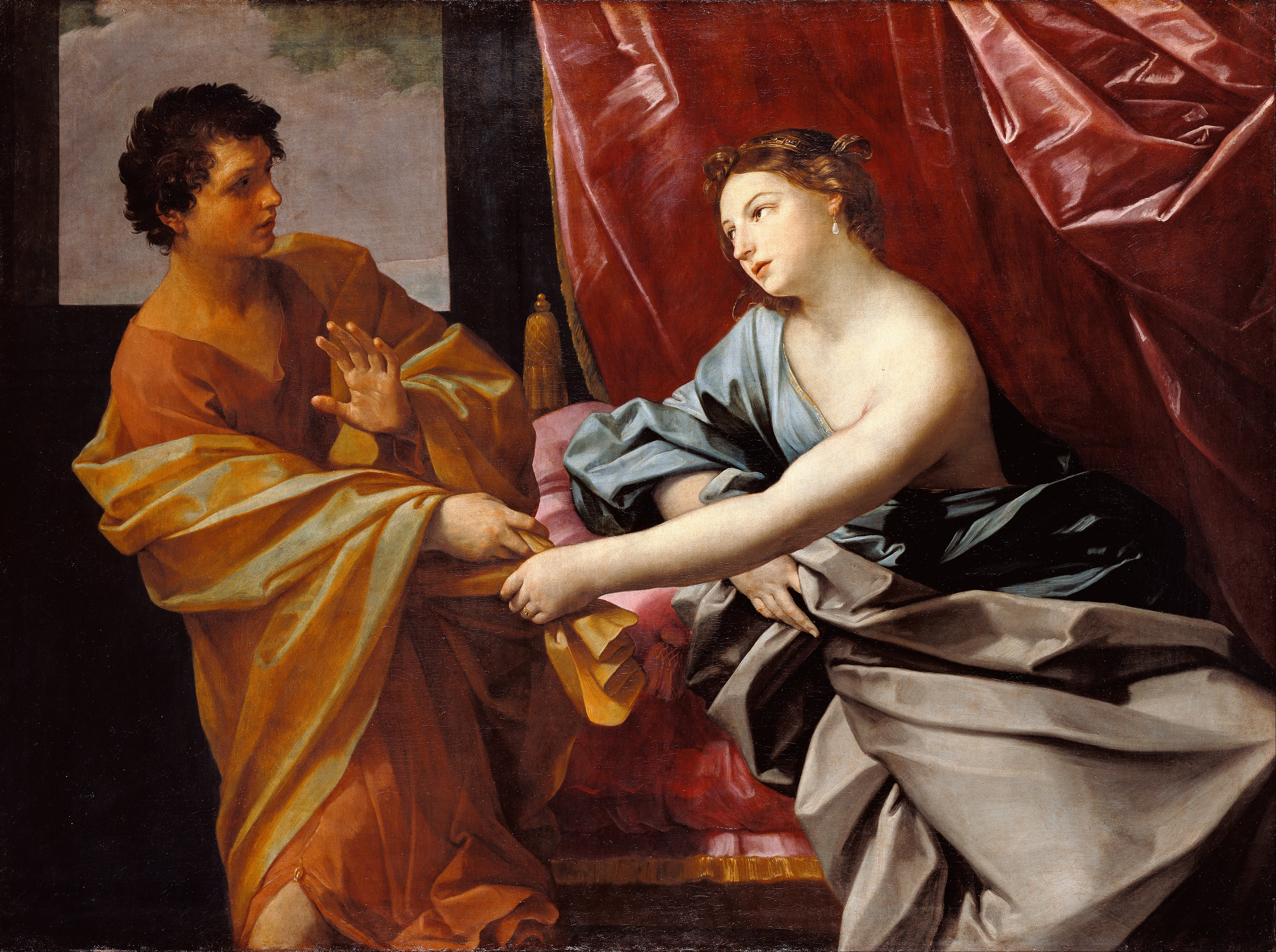
Joseph and Potiphar's Wife, c. 1630

Returning to Bologna more or less permanently after 1614, Reni established a successful and prolific studio there. He was commissioned to decorate the cupola of the chapel of Saint Dominic in Bologna's Basilica of San Domenico between 1613 and 1615, resulting in the radiant fresco Saint Dominic in Glory, a masterpiece that can stand comparison with the exquisite Arca di San Domenico below it.

He also contributed to the decoration of the Rosary Chapel in the same church with a Resurrection; and in 1611 he had already painted for San Domenico a superb Massacre of the Innocents (now in the Pinacoteca Nazionale di Bologna) which became an important reference for the French Neoclassic style, as well as a model for details in Picasso's Guernica. In 1614–15 he painted The Israelites Gathering Manna for a chapel in the cathedral of Ravenna.

Circa 1615 in Bologna, Reni created one of his most reproduced works, Saint Sebastian (sometimes called by the Italian San Sebastiano). The painting is thought to have been a commission for a member of the papal court due to the presence of lapis lazuli in the blue of the sky, an expensive material usually supplied by clients. Reni painted Saint Sebastian a total of six times, though the 1615 rendition is arguably the most recognizable. Notably, the painting has been adored by Oscar Wilde and other gay artists throughout history.

Leaving Bologna briefly in 1618, Reni travelled to Naples to complete a commission to paint a ceiling in a chapel of the cathedral of San Gennaro. However, in Naples, other prominent local painters, including Corenzio, Caracciolo and Ribera, were vehemently resistant to competitors, and according to rumour, conspired to poison or otherwise harm Reni (as may have befallen Domenichino in Naples after him). Reni's assistant was so badly wounded that he returned to Rome. Reni, who had a great fear of being poisoned, chose not to outstay his welcome.

After leaving Rome, Reni alternately painted in different styles, but displayed less eclectic tastes than many of Carracci's trainees. For example, his altarpiece for Samson Victorious formulates stylized poses, like those characteristic of Mannerism.

In contrast, his Crucifixion and his Atlanta and Hipomenes depict dramatic diagonal movement coupled with the effects of light and shade that portray the more Baroque influence of Caravaggio. His turbulent yet realistic Massacre of the Innocents (Pinacoteca, Bologna) is painted in a manner reminiscent of a late Raphael. In 1625, Prince Władysław Sigismund Vasa of Poland visited the artist's workshop in Bologna during his visit to Western Europe. The close rapport between the painter and the Polish prince resulted in the acquisition of drawings and paintings.

In 1630, while Bologna was suffering from plague, Reni was commissioned by the Senate of Bologna to paint Pallion del Voto with images of Saints Ignatius of Loyola and Francis Xavier, and of the Virgin Mary with child accompanied by the patron saints of Bologna.

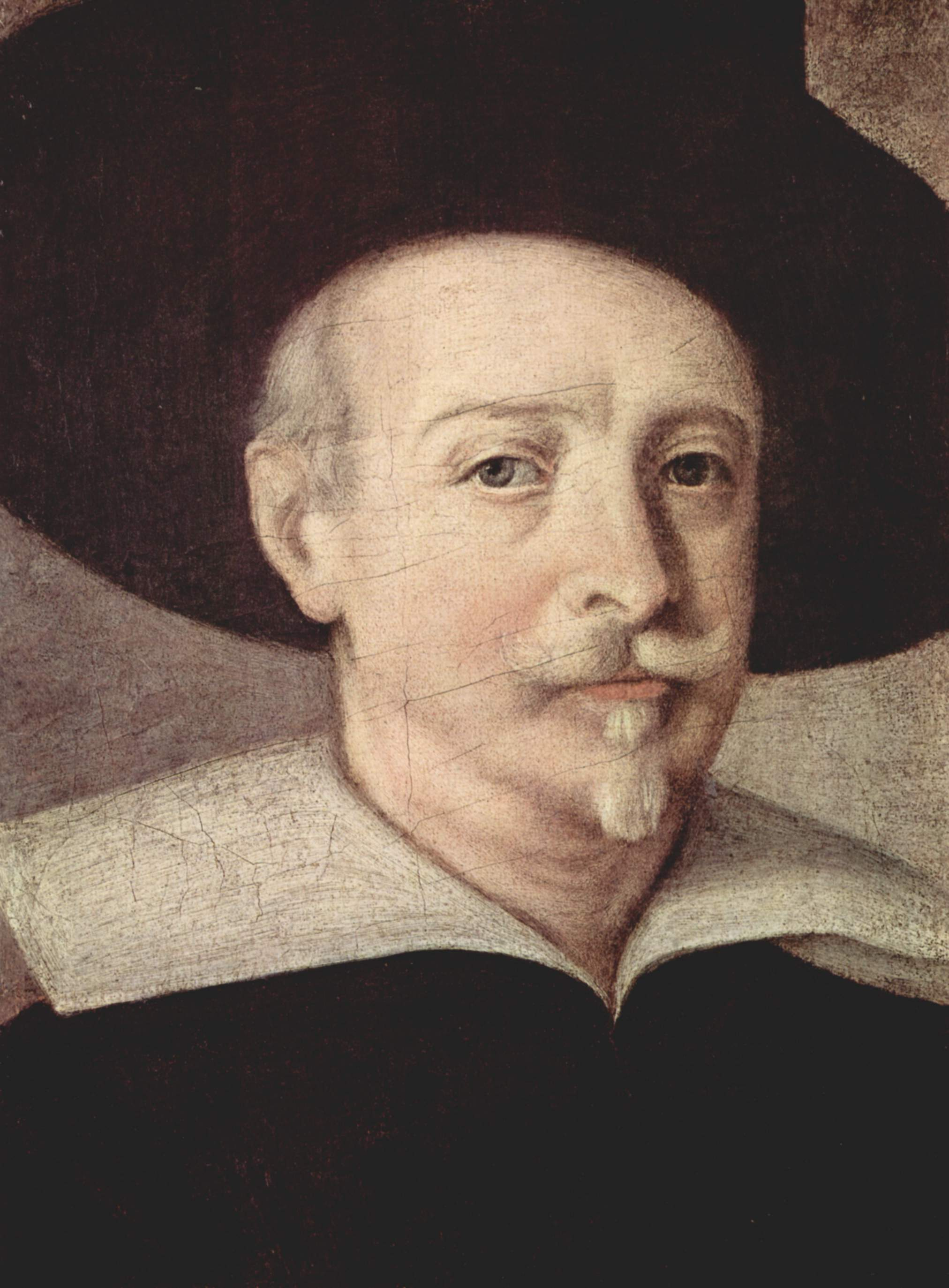
Self-portrait, c. 1635

By the 1630s, Reni's painting style became looser, less impastoed, and dominated by lighter colours. A compulsive gambler, Reni was often in financial distress despite the steady demand for his paintings. According to his biographer, Carlo Cesare Malvasia, Reni's need to recoup gambling losses resulted in rushed execution and multiple copies of his works produced by his workshop. The paintings of his last years include many unfinished works.

Reni's themes are mostly biblical and mythological. He painted a few portraits; those of Sixtus V and of Cardinal Bernardino Spada are among the most noteworthy, along with one of his mother (in the Pinacoteca Nazionale di Bologna) and a few self-portraits – both from his youth and from his old age.

The so-called "Beatrice Cenci", formerly ascribed to Reni and praised by generations of admirers, is now regarded as a doubtful attribution. Beatrice Cenci was executed in Rome before Reni ever lived there and thus could not have sat for the portrait. Many etchings are attributed to Guido Reni, some after his own paintings and some after other masters. They are spirited, in a light style of delicate lines and dots. Reni's technique, as used by the Bolognese school, was the standard for Italian printmakers of his time.

Reni died in Bologna in 1642. He was buried there in the Rosary Chapel of the Basilica of San Domenico; the painter Elisabetta Sirani (whose father had been Reni's pupil and whom some considered the artistic reincarnation of Reni) was later interred in the same tomb.

== Pupils and legacy ==
Reni was the most famous Italian artist of his generation.

Through his many pupils, he had a wide-ranging influence on the later Baroque. In the centre of Bologna, he established two studios, teeming with nearly 200 pupils. His most distinguished pupil was Simone Cantarini, named Il Pesarese, who painted the portrait of his master now in the Bolognese Gallery.

Reni's other Bolognese pupils included Antonio Randa (early on in his career considered the best pupil of Reni, until he tried to kill his master), Vincenzo Gotti, Emilio Savonanzi, Sebastiano Brunetti, Tommaso Campana, Domenico Maria Canuti, Bartolomeo Marescotti, Giovanni Maria Tamburino, and Pietro Gallinari (Pierino del Signor Guido).

Other artists who trained under Reni include Antonio Giarola (Cavalier Coppa), Giovanni Battista Michelini, Guido Cagnacci, Giovanni Boulanger of Troyes, Paolo Biancucci of Lucca, Pietro Ricci or Righi of Lucca, Pietro Lauri Monsu, Giacomo Semenza, Gioseffo and Giovanni Stefano Danedi, Giovanni Giacomo Manno, Carlo Cittadini of Milan, Luigi Scaramuccia, Bernardo Cerva, Francesco Costanzo Cattaneo of Ferrara, Giulio Dinarelli, Francesco Gessi, and Marco Bandinelli.

Beyond Italy, Reni's influence was important in the style of many Spanish Baroque artists, such as Jusepe de Ribera and Murillo.

But his work was particularly appreciated in France—Stendhal believed Reni must have had "a French soul"—and influenced generations of French artists such as Le Sueur, Le Brun, Vien, and Greuze; as well as on later French Neoclassic painters. In the 19th century, Reni's reputation declined as a result of changing taste—epitomized by John Ruskin's censorious judgment that the artist's work was sentimental and false.

A revival of interest in Reni has occurred since 1954, when an important retrospective exhibition of his work was mounted in Bologna.

== Partial anthology of works ==
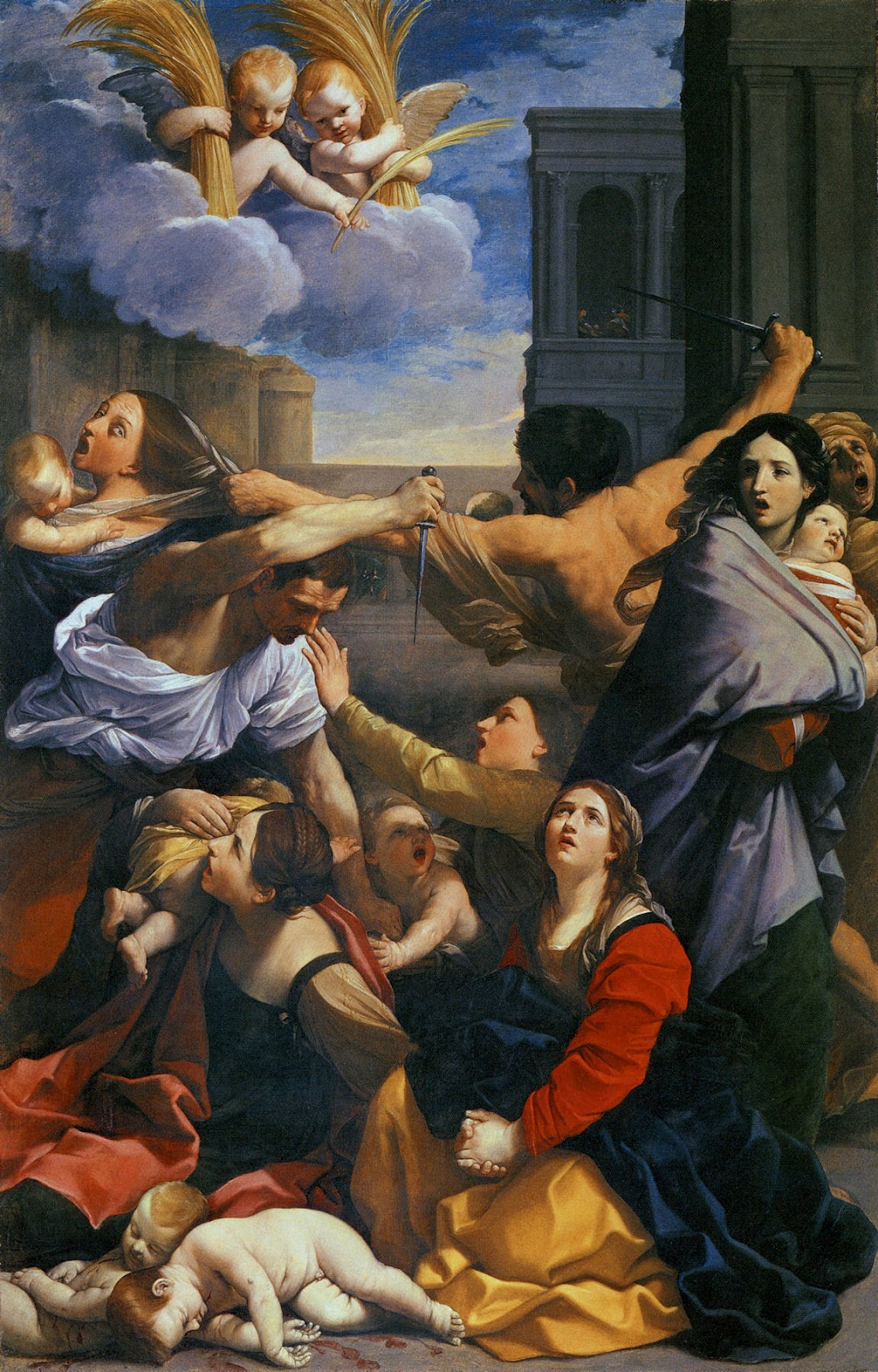
Massacre of the Innocents, 1611

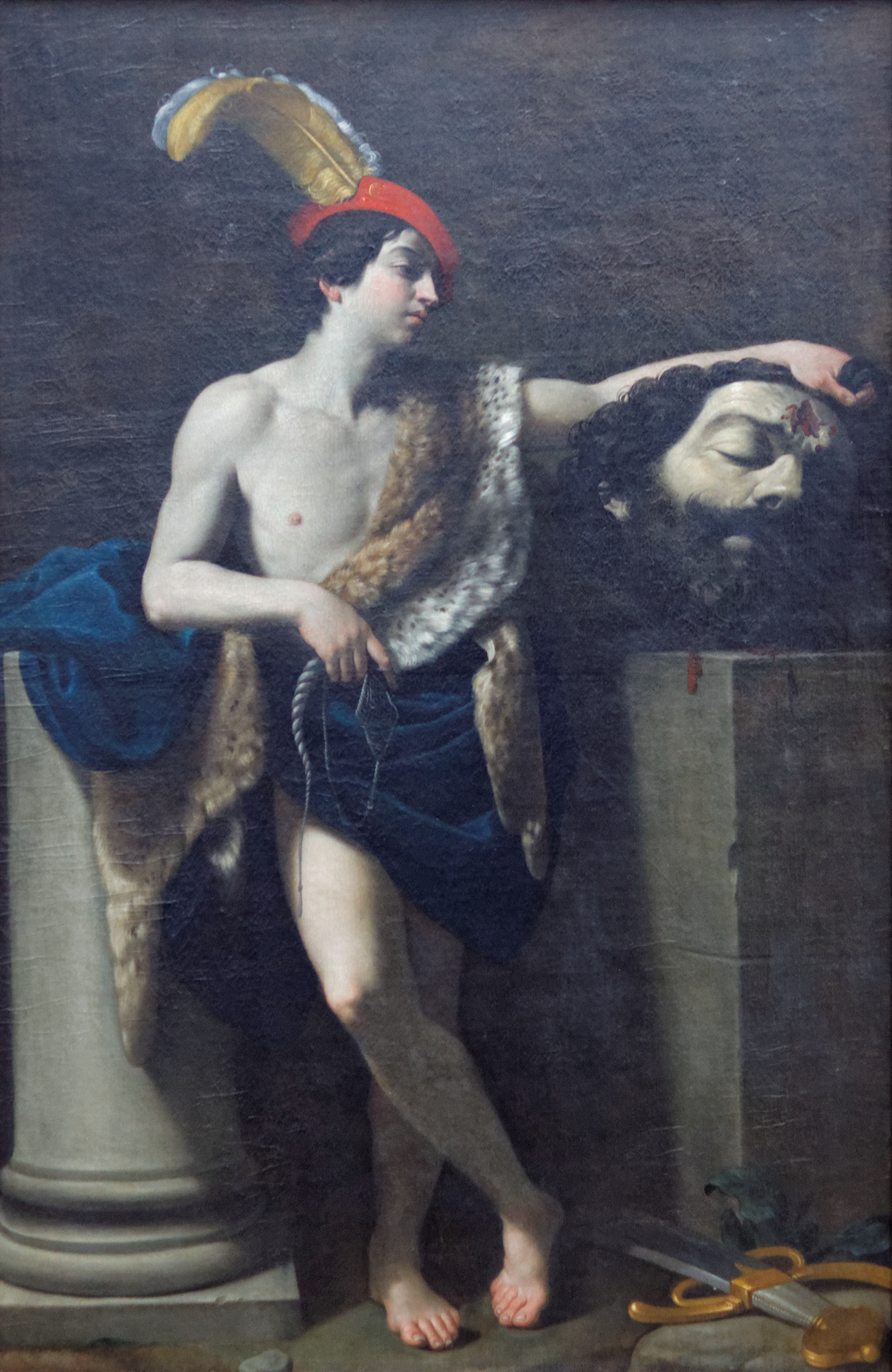
David with the Head of Goliath, c. 1605, oil on canvas

- Galatea and Acis, attributed, Grand Palace at Gatchina, Saint Petersburg, Russia
- Self-Portrait
- Callisto and Diana
- Crucifixion of St Peter, Vatican Museums, Rome
- Christ Crucified, San Lorenzo in Lucina, Rome
- Cupids Fighting Putti, Doria Pamphilj Gallery, Rome
- Four Seasons, Museo di Capodimonte, Naples
- Holy Trinity, Santissima Trinità dei Pellegrini, Rome
- The Immaculate Conception, Chiesa di San Biagio, Forlì
- Massacre of the Innocents, Pinacoteca Nazionale, Bologna
- Penitent Magdalene, ca. 1635, Walters Art Museum, Baltimore
- Penitent Peter, Mabee-Gerrer Museum of Art, Shawnee, Oklahoma
- Lament over the Body of Christ, Pinacoteca Nazionale, Bologna
- Ecce Homo, Gemäldegalerie Alte Meister, Dresden
- Ecce Homo, 1639, The Fitzwilliam Museum, Cambridge
- Saints Peter and Paul, Pinacoteca di Brera, Milan
- Assumption of the Virgin, Chiesa del Gesù e dei Santi Ambrogio e Andrea, Genoa
- Assumption of Mary, Chiesa parrocchiale di Santa Maria, Castelfranco Emilia
- St Paul the Hermit and St Anthony in the Wilderness, Gemäldegalerie, Berlin
- Fortune, Vatican Museums
- Samson Drinking from the Jawbone of an Ass, Pinacoteca Nazionale, Bologna
- Ariadne, Capitoline Museums
- Atalanta and Hippomenes, 1612, Prado, Madrid
- St Philip Neri in Ecstasy, 1614, Roman Oratory church, Santa Maria in Vallicella - The Chiesa Nuova, Rome
- Atalanta and Hippomenes, 1622–25, Museo di Capodimonte, Naples
- Madonna of the Rosary, Madonna di San Luca, Bologna
- Labors of Hercules, Louvre
- Suicide of Lucrezia, ca. 1625–40, São Paulo Art Museum, São Paulo
- Lucrezia and Cleopatra, Pinacoteca Capitolina, Rome
- Polyphemus, Pinacoteca Capitolina, Rome
- Annunziata Chapel, Quirinal Palace, Rome
- St Sebastian, Pinacoteca Nazionale, Bologna
- St Sebastian, Dulwich Picture Gallery; other versions are in the collections of the Cheltenham Art Gallery and Museum in the UK, the Palazzo Rosso in Genoa, the Capitoline Museum, the Louvre and at least 7 other known originals and multiple copies such as at the Kunsthistorisches Museum in Vienna.
- St John the Baptist in the Wilderness, Dulwich Picture Gallery
- Adoration of the Magi, Certosa di San Martino, Naples
- Susannah and the Elders, The National Gallery, United Kingdom
- Judith, Birmingham Museum of Art, Birmingham, Alabama, United States
- Lotta di Putti, Galleria Doria Pamphilj, Rome
- The Flagellation, St. Francis Xavier Church, Taos, Missouri, United States
- St John the Evangelist, Muscarelle Museum of Art, Williamsburg, VA
- Triumph of Job, Cathedral of Notre Dame, Paris
- Jesus Christ with the Cross, Real Academia de Bellas Artes de San Fernando, Madrid
- Conversion of St Paul, Patrimonio nacional, Madrid
- An Evangelist, House of Alba Foundation, at Liria Palace, Madrid

The Louvre contains twenty of his pictures, the Prado Museum in Madrid eighteen, the National Gallery of London seven, and others once there have now been removed to other public collections. Among the seven is the small Coronation of the Virgin, painted on copper. It was probably painted before the master left Bologna for Rome.

== Gallery ==
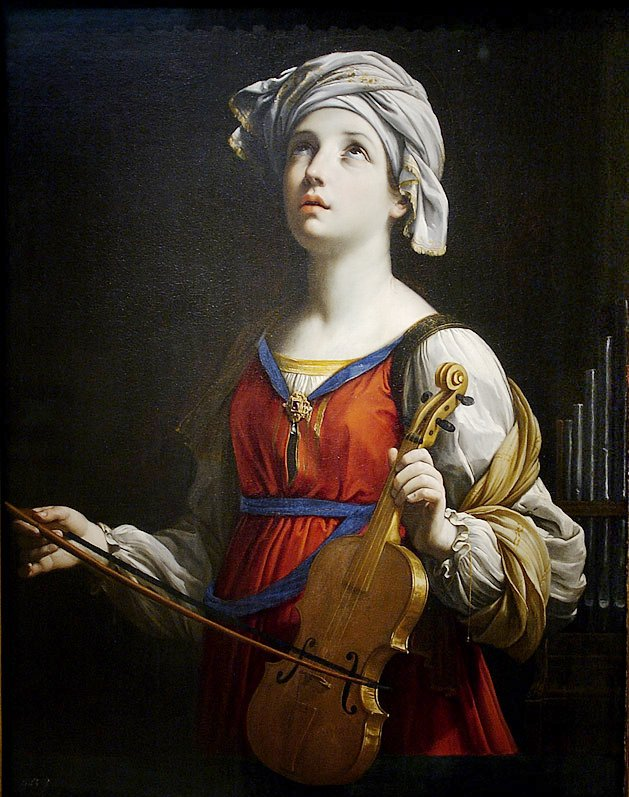
Saint Cecilia, 1606

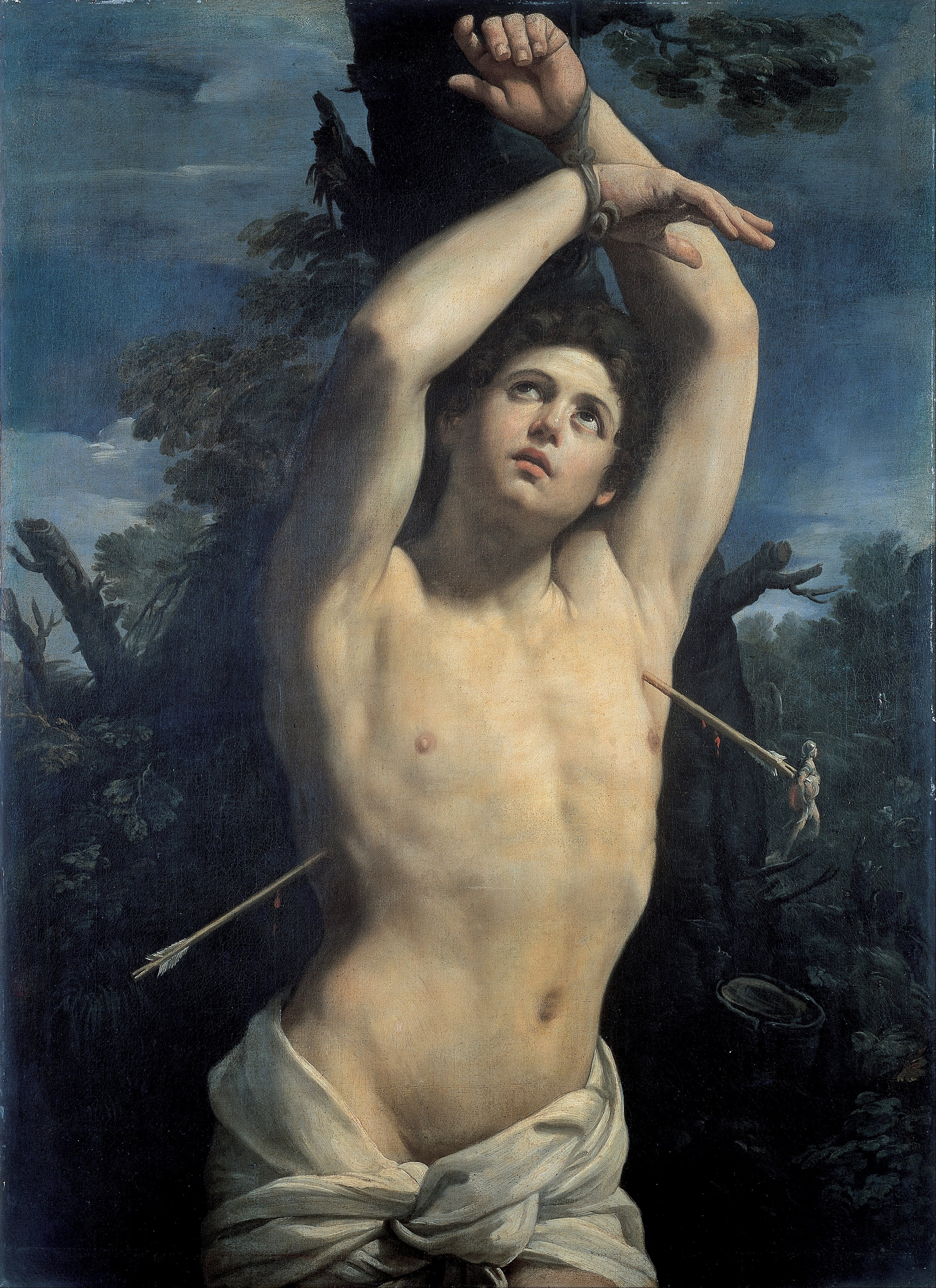
Saint Sebastian, c. 1615

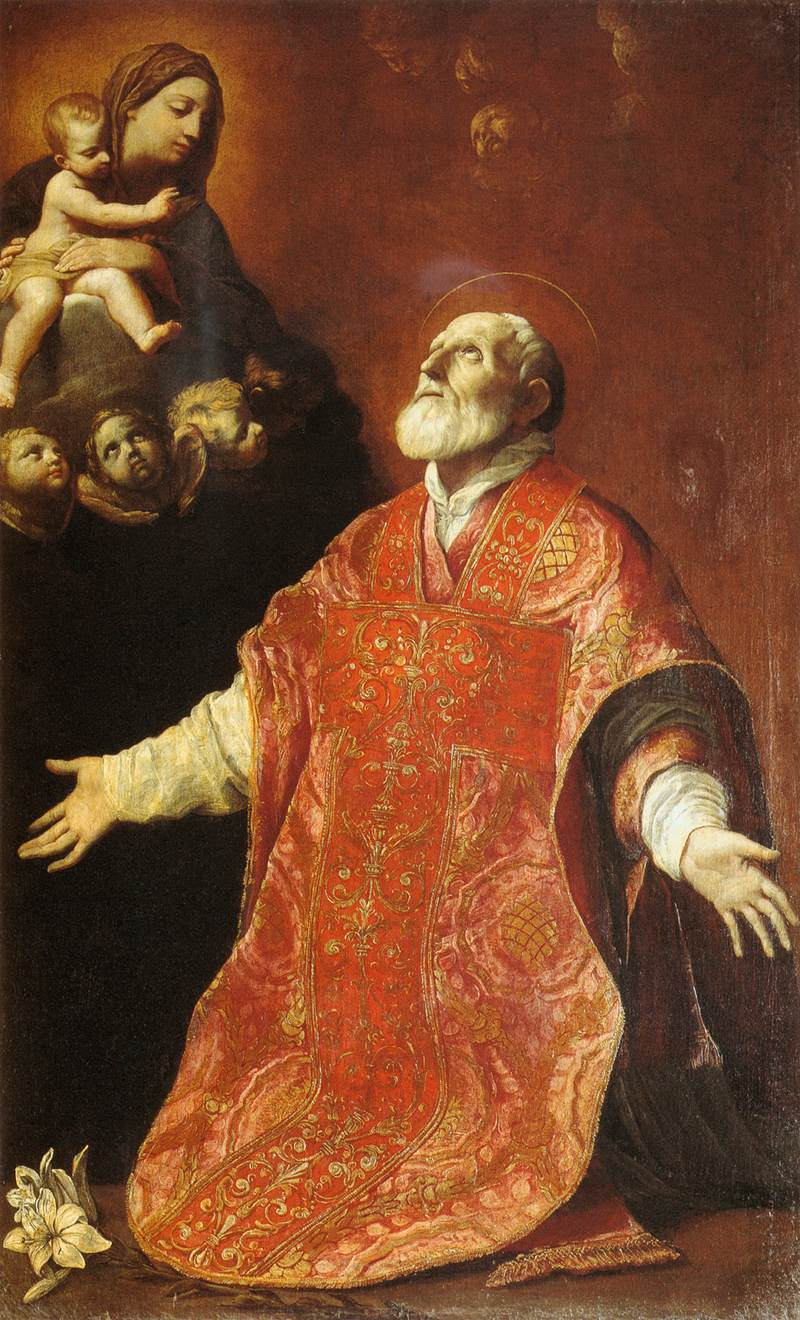
St Philip Neri in Ecstasy, 1614, Oratory church Chiesa Nuova, Rome

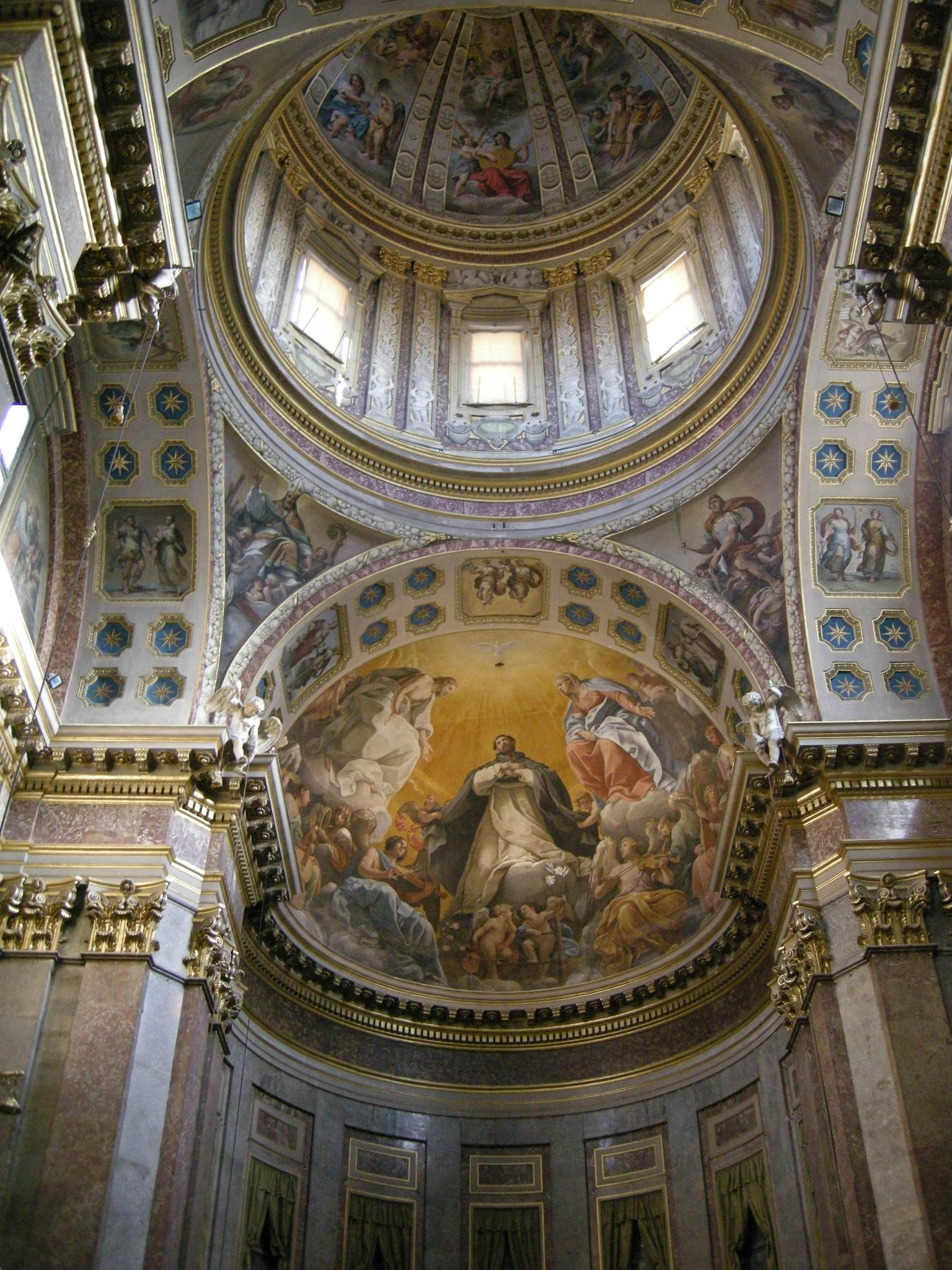
St Dominic's Glory crowning the Arca di San Domenico, 1613–1615

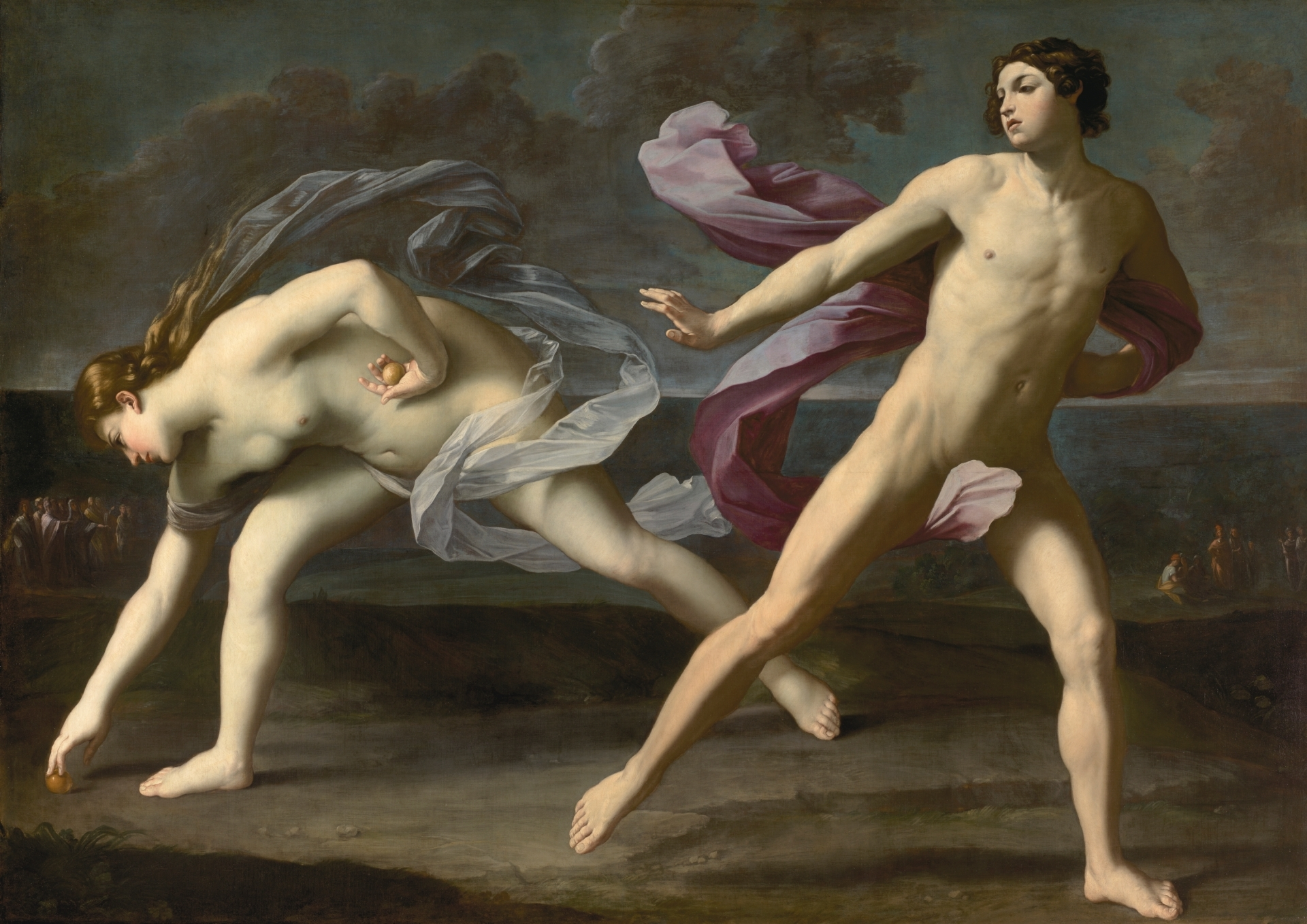
Hippomenes and Atalanta, 1618–1619, Prado Museum

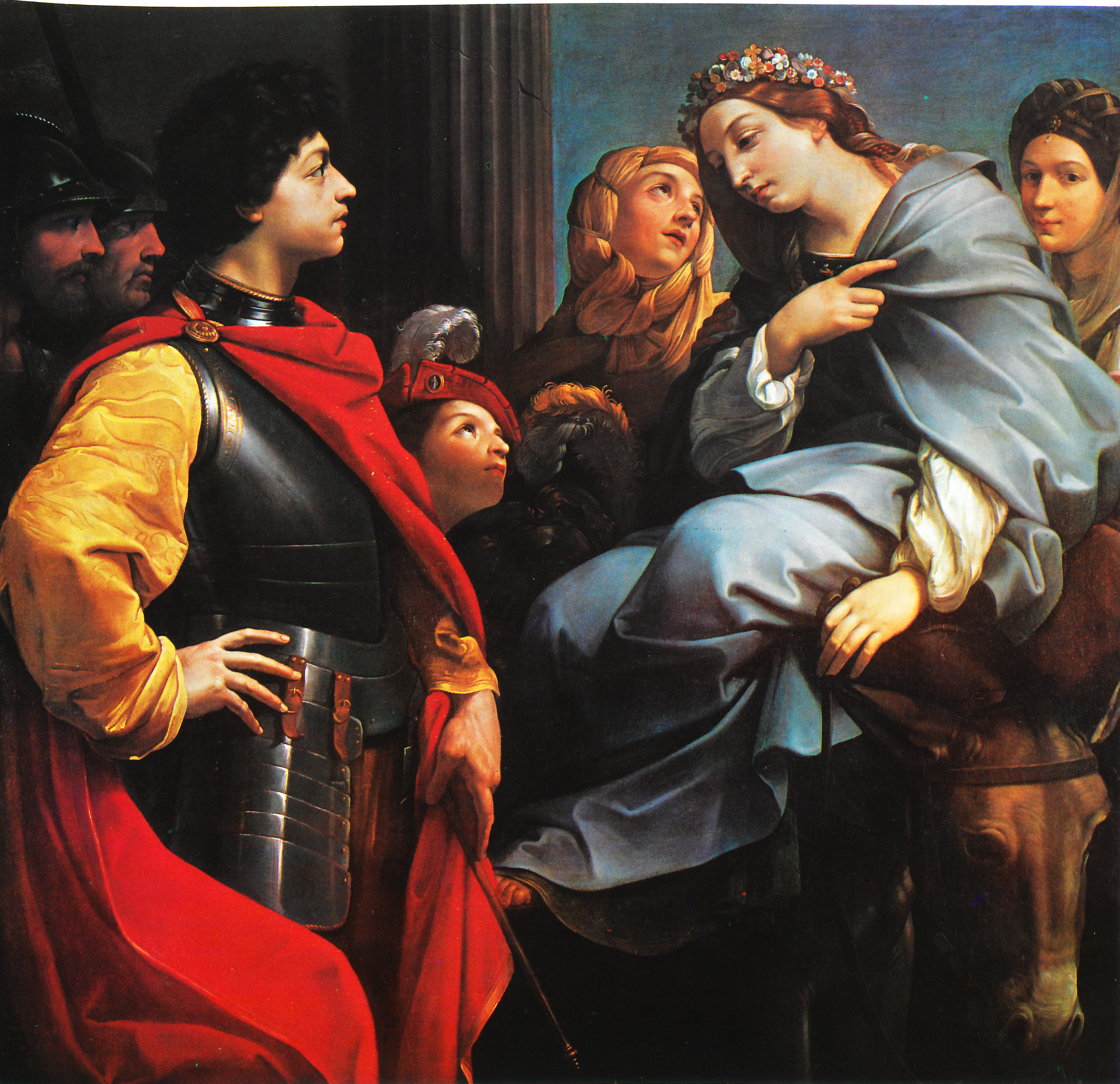
David and Abigail, c. 1615

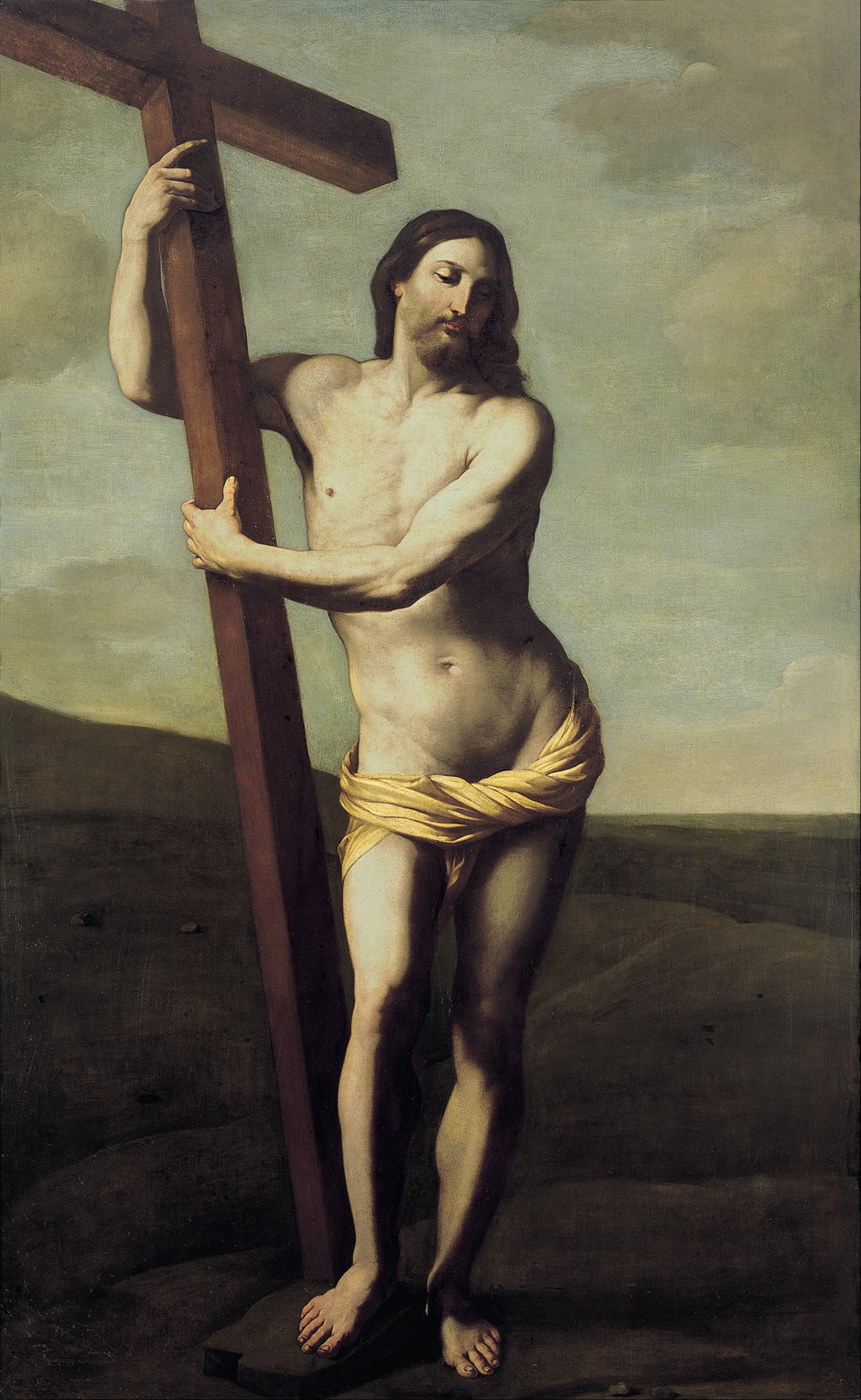
Jesus Christ with the Cross, 1621

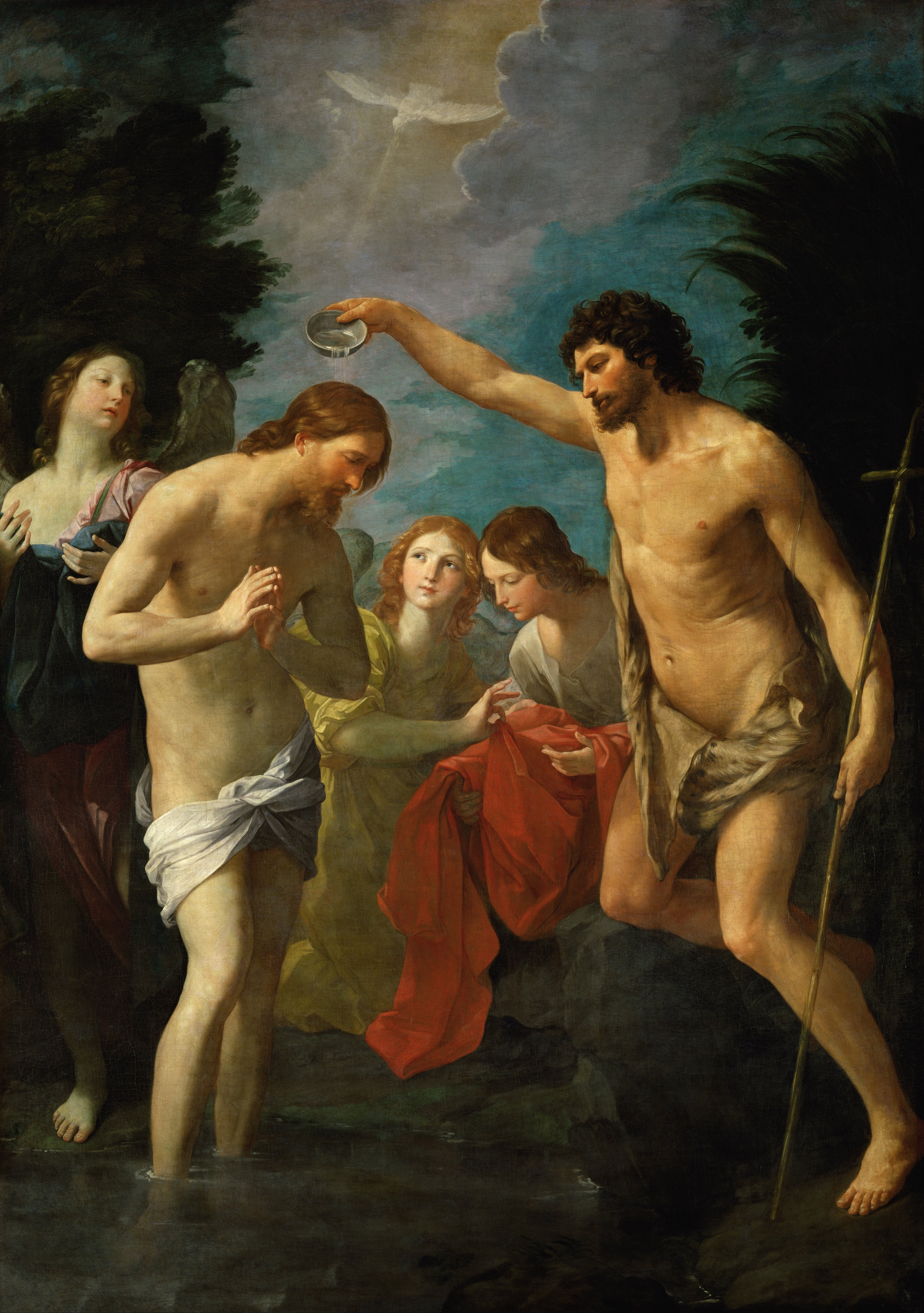
The Baptism of Christ, ca. 1622–1623

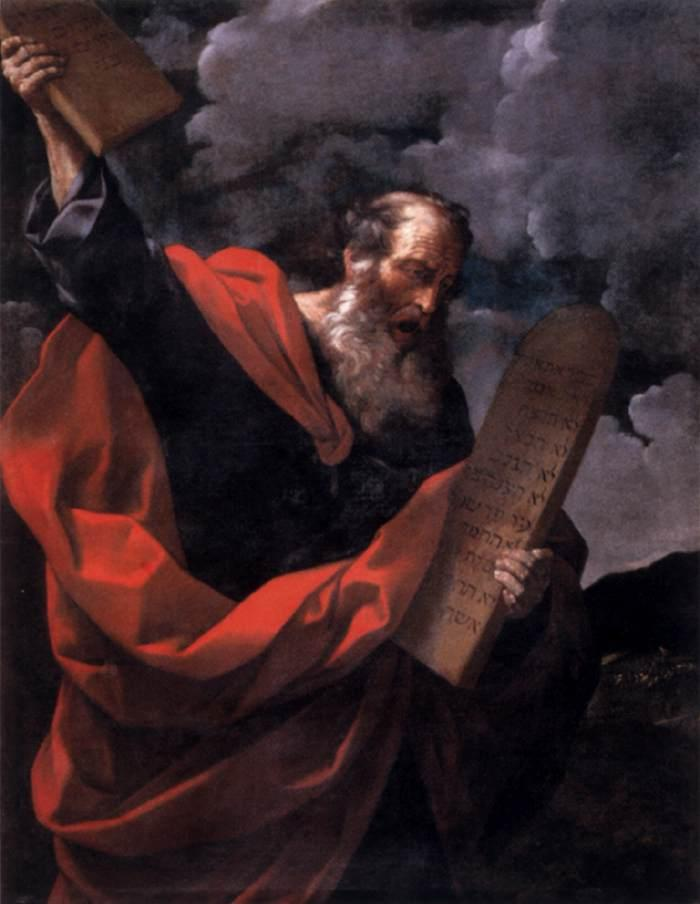
Moses with the Tablets of the Law, c. 1624, Galleria Borghese

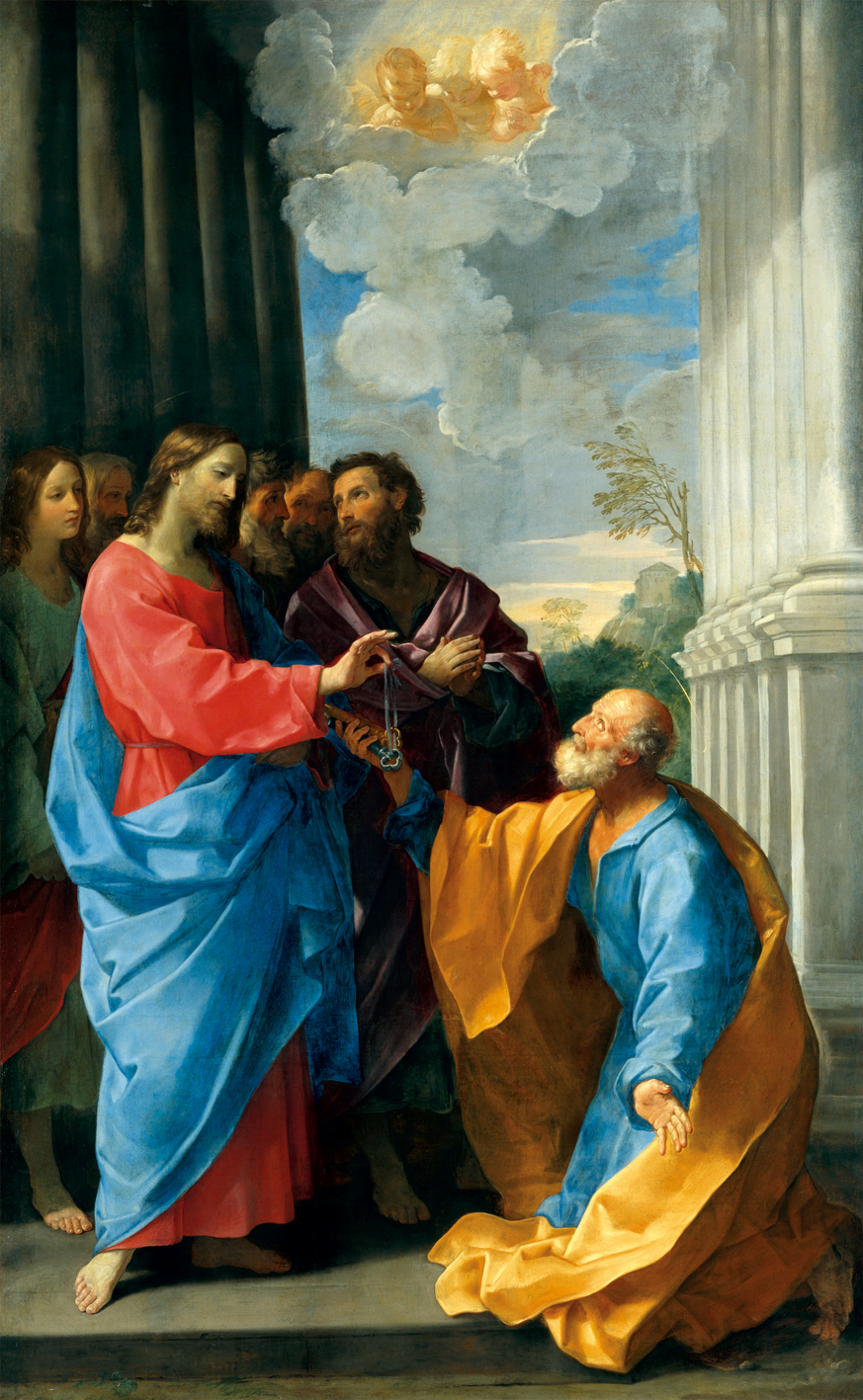
Christ Giving the Keys to St. Peter, 1626, Louvre

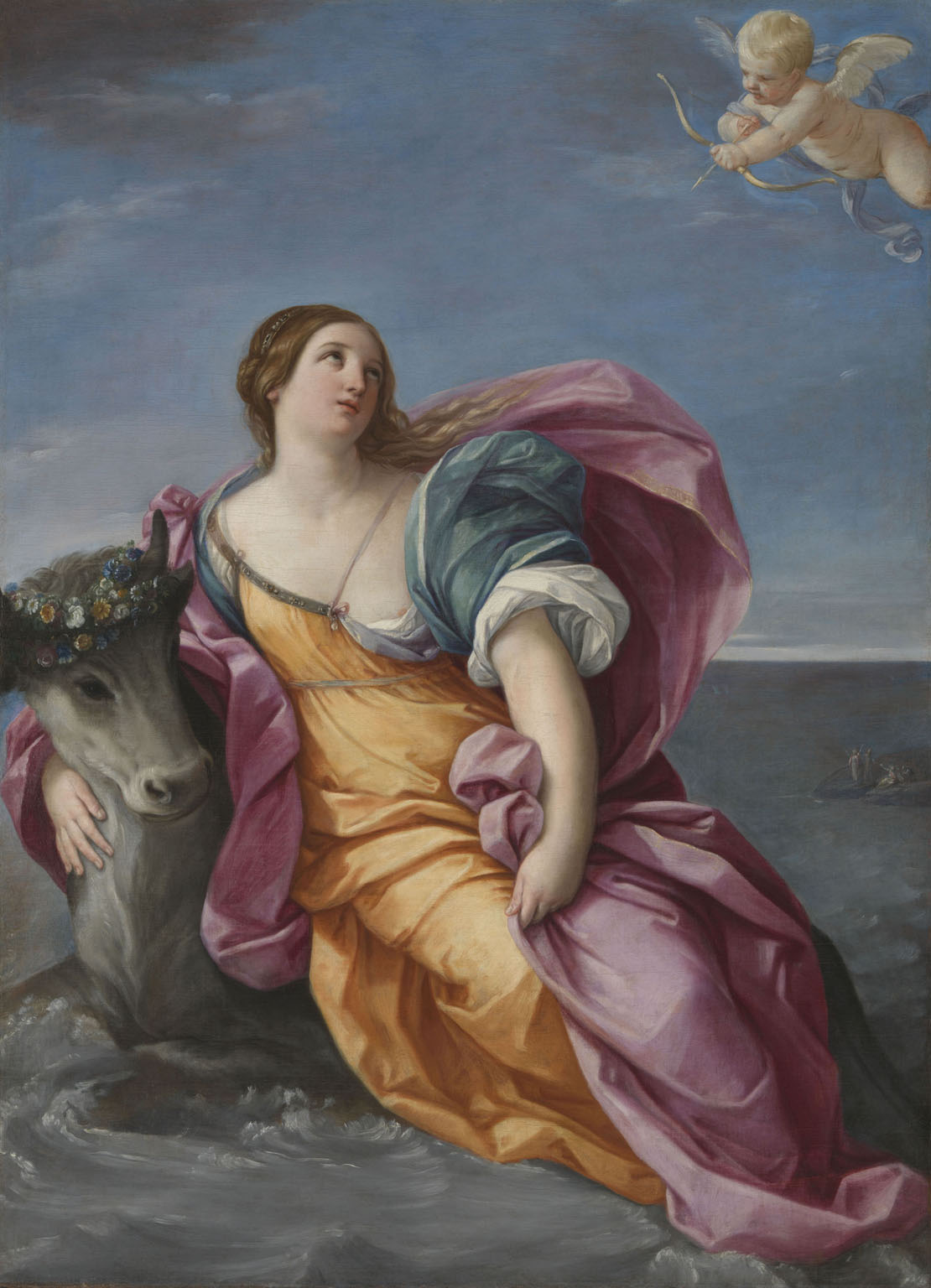
The Rape of Europa, 1630s, The National Gallery, London. Made for King Władysław IV of Poland.

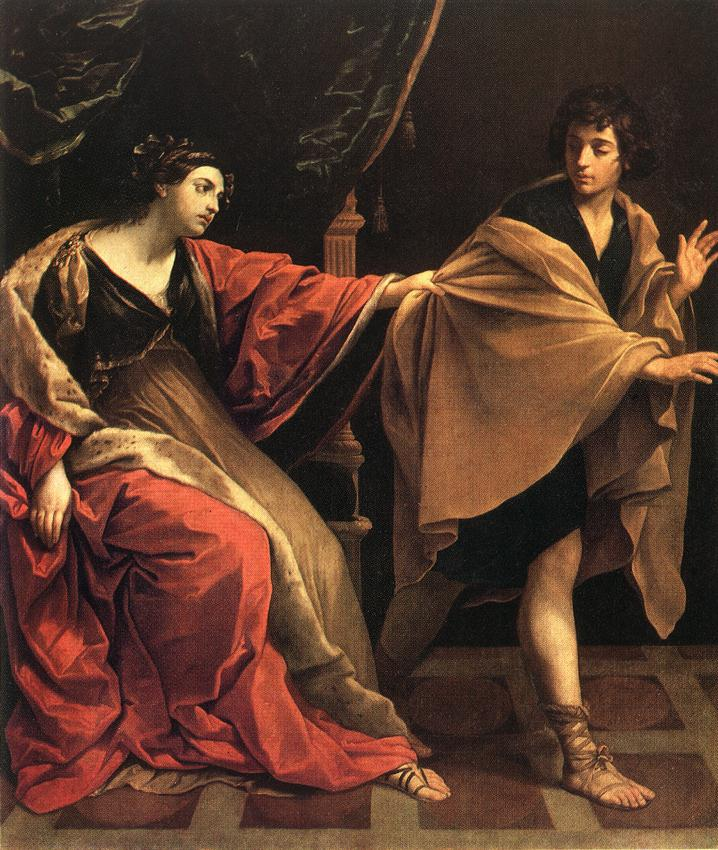
Joseph and Potiphar's Wife, 1631

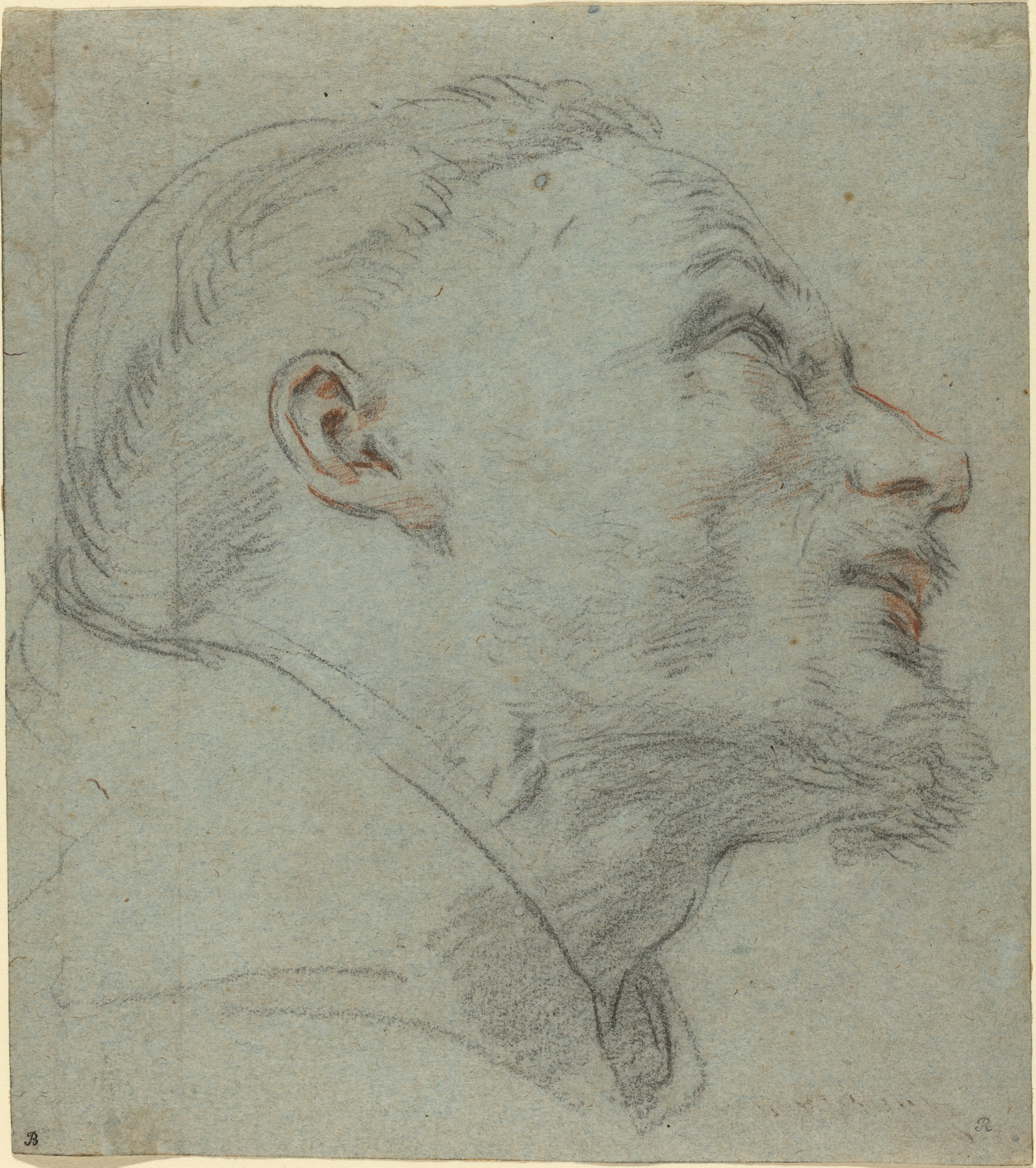
Head of Saint Francis, before c. 1632, National Gallery of Art

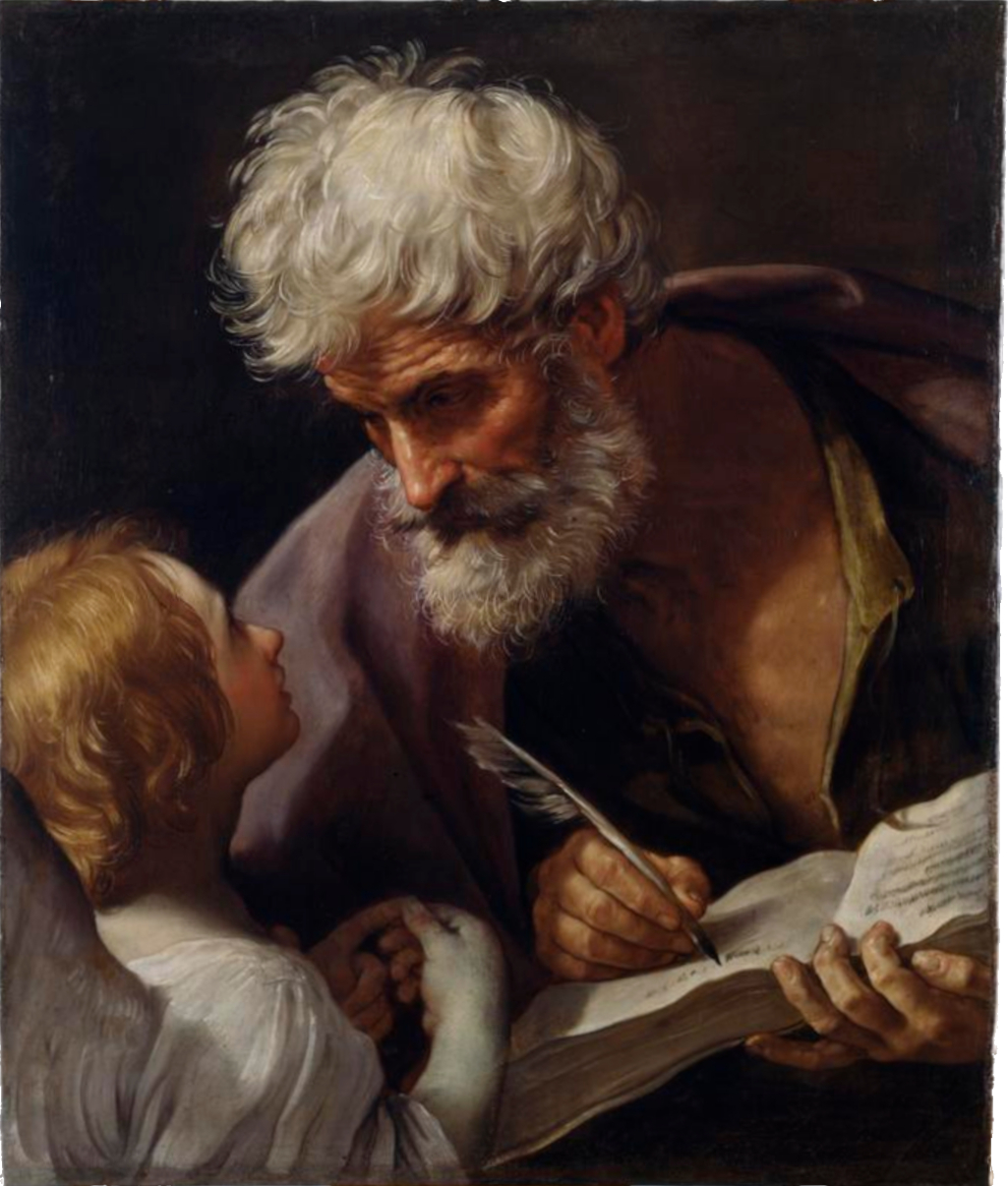
St Matthew and the Angel, c. 1635–1640

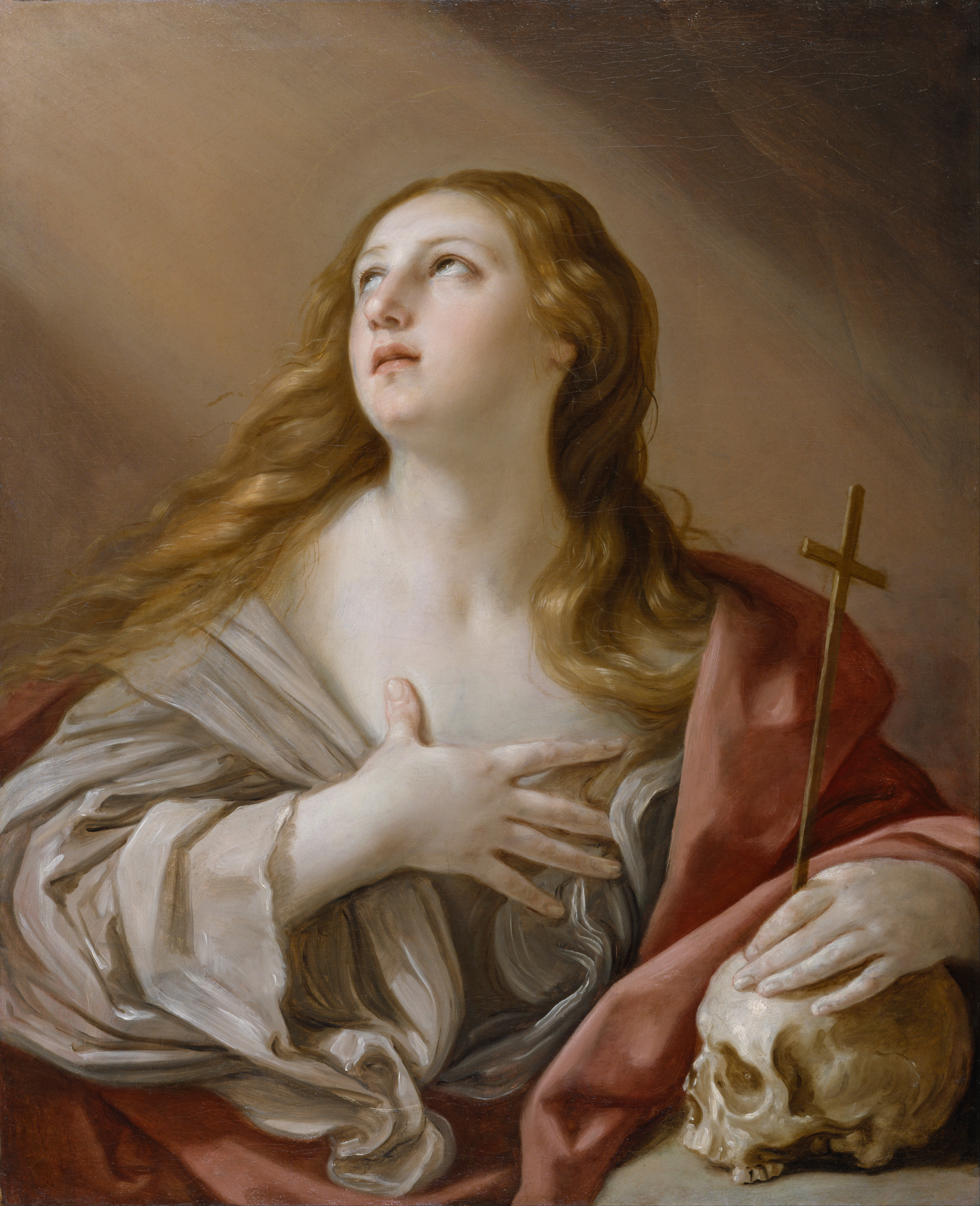
The Penitent Magdalene, ca. 1635

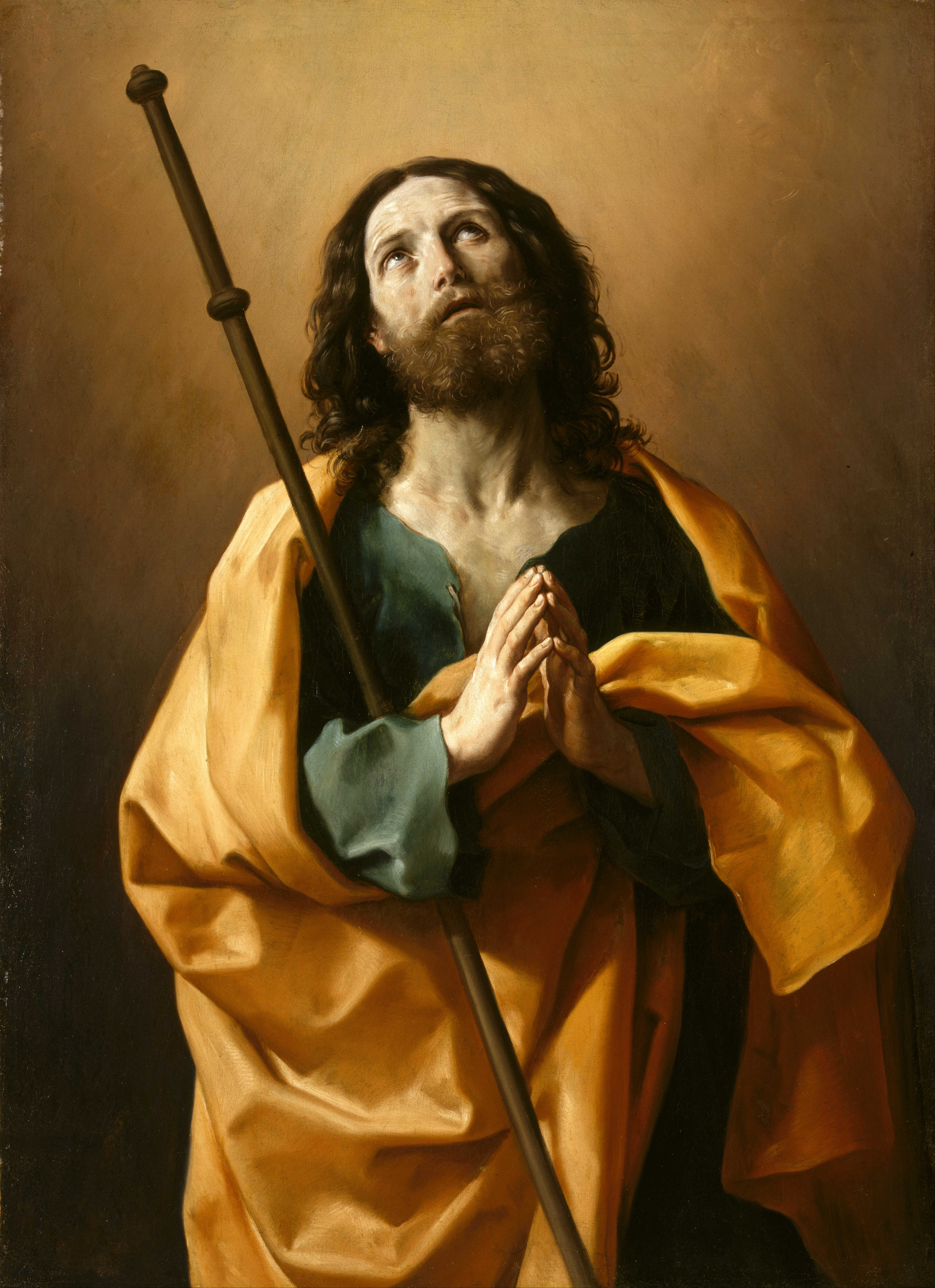
Saint James the Greater, ca. 1636–1638

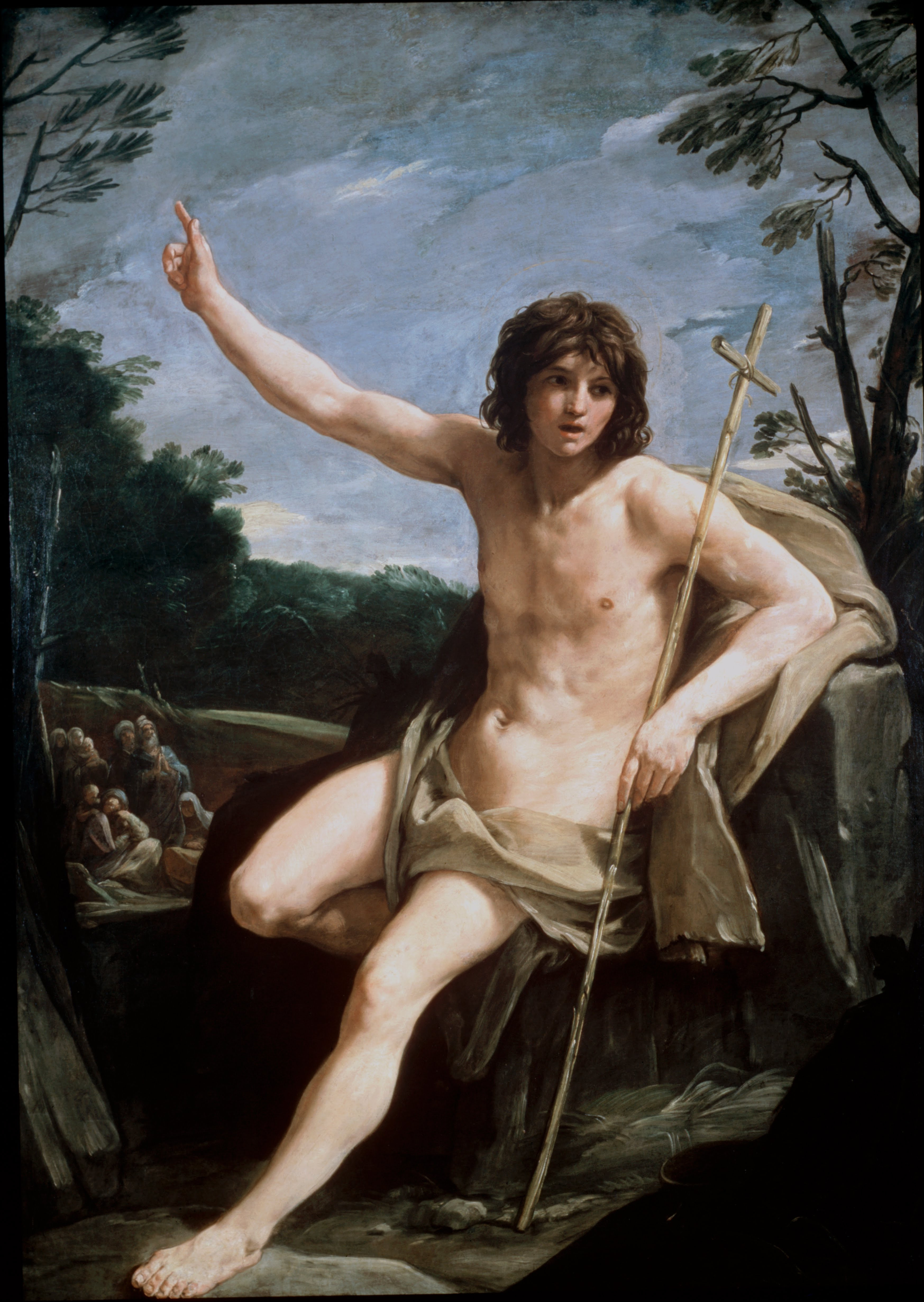
St John the Baptist in the Wilderness, 1636–1637

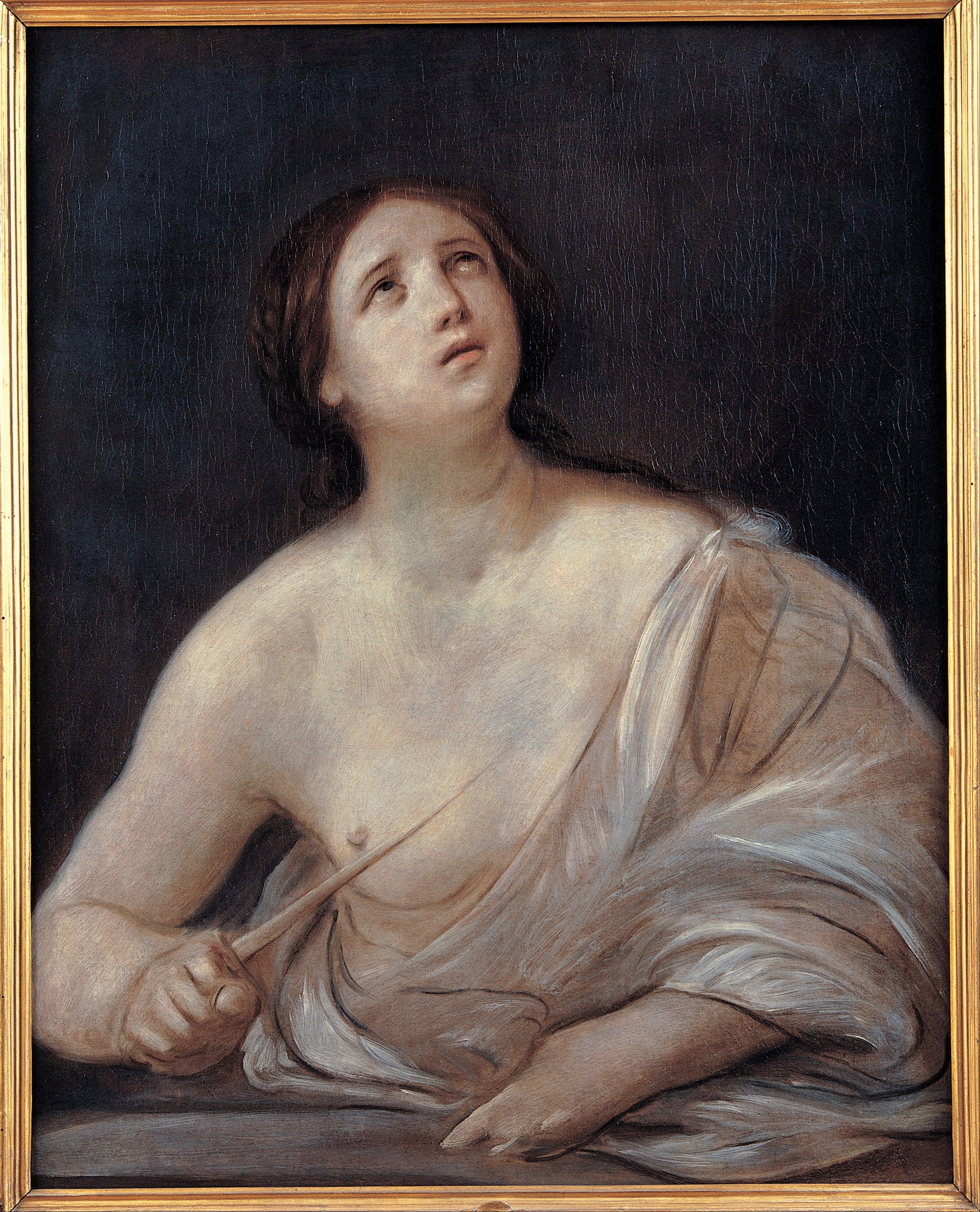
Lucretia, 1640–1642

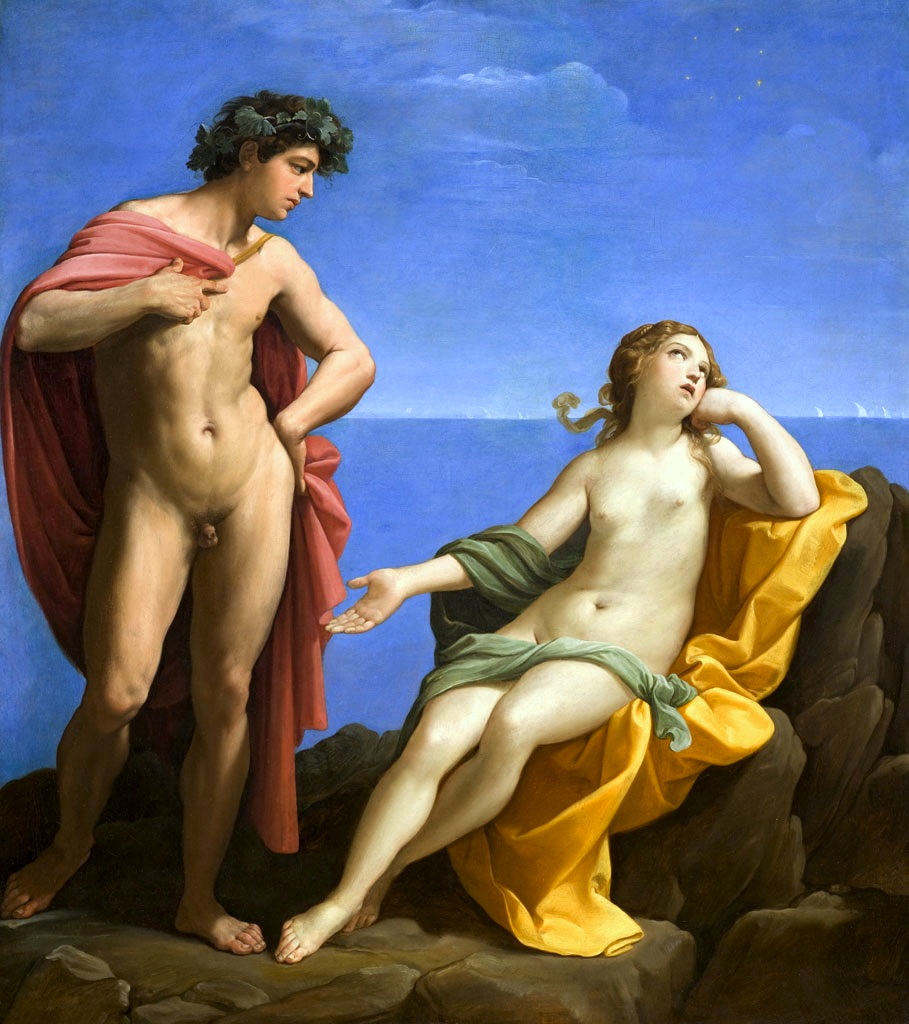
Bacchus and Ariadne, circa 1619–1620, Los Angeles County Museum of Art

== References and sources ==
=== Sources ===
- Cavalli, Gian Carlo (ed.)Guido Reni exh. cat. Bologna 1954
- Pepper, Stephen, Guido Reni, Oxford 1984
- Marzia Faietti, 'Rome 1610: Guido Reni after Annibale Carracci' Print Quarterly, XXVIII, 2011, pp. 276–81
- Orlandi, Pellegrino Antonio; Guarienti, Pietro, Abecedario Pittorico, Naples, 1719 Abecedario pittorico del M.R.P. Pellegrino Antonio Orlandi, Bolognese : contenente notizie de'professore di pittura, scoltura, ed architettura, in questa edizione corretto e notabilmente di nuove notizie accresciuto
- Guido Reni 1575-1642 (exhibition catalogue Pinacoteca Nazionale, Bologna; Los Angeles County Museum of art; Kimbell Art Museum, Fort Worth) Bologna 1988
- Spear, Richard, The 'Divine' Guido: Religion, Sex, Money, and Art in the World of Guido Reni, New Haven and London, 1997
- Hansen, Morten Steen and Joaneath Spicer, eds., Masterpieces of Italian Painting, The Walters Art Museum, Baltimore and London, 2005
- "Printmaking". Encyclopædia Britannica. 2007. Encyclopædia Britannica Online. 29 March 2007
