= Pietro Gallinari =

Italian painter

Pietro Gallinari, also known as Pierino del Signor Guido, (1600s–1640) was an Italian painter of the Baroque period. He was a close follower of Guido Reni in Bologna. He painted for the churches and court of Guastalla. He died young, perhaps of poisoning.
