= Risen Christ (Reni) =

Painting by Guido Reni

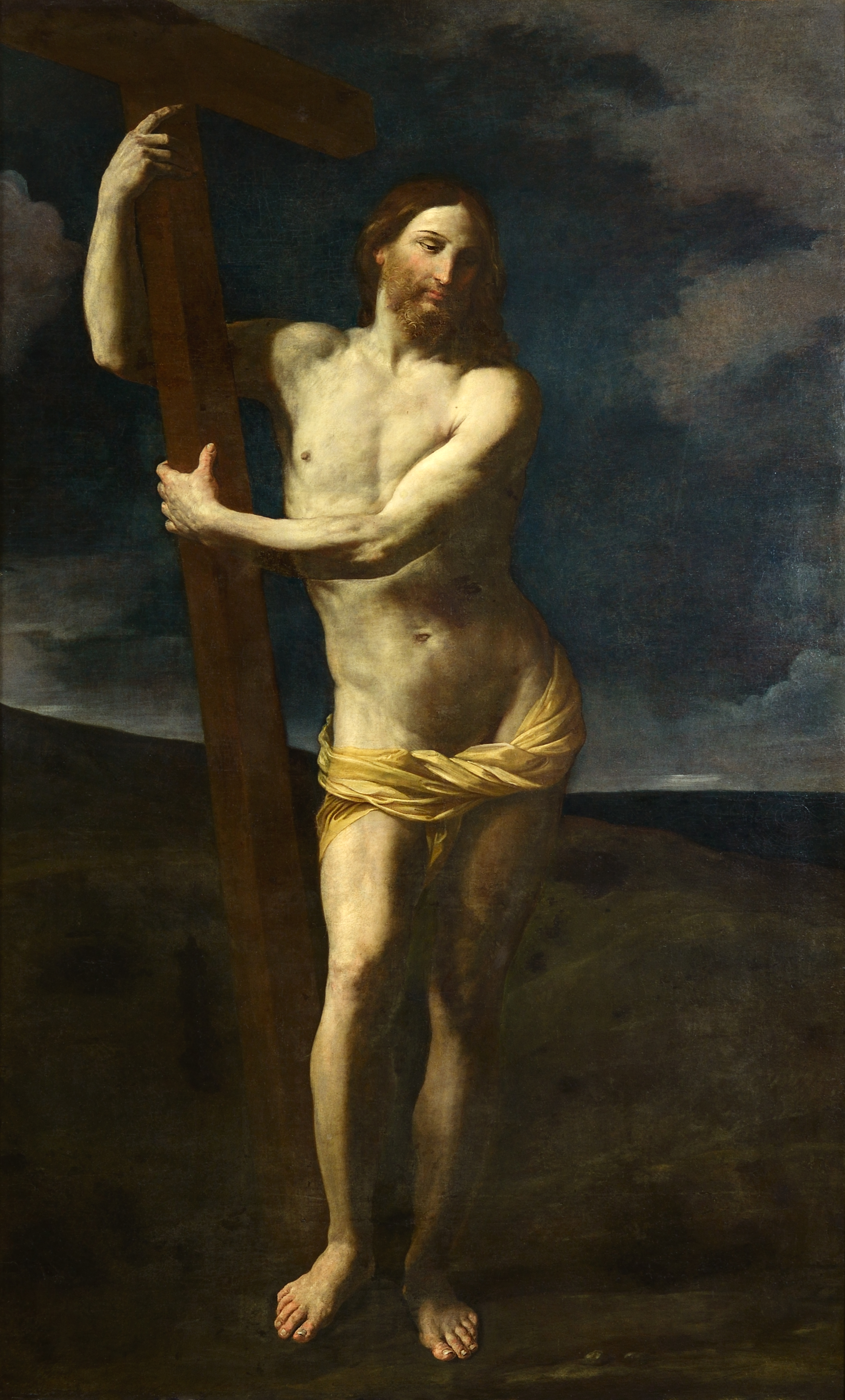
- Risen Christ (1620) by Guido Reni
- Artist: Guido Reni
- Year: 1620
- Medium: oil on canvas
- Dimensions: 228 cm × 138 cm (90 in × 54 in)
- Location: MUŻA, Valletta, Malta

Risen Christ is an oil on canvas painting by Guido Reni, from 1620.

== Description ==
The painting is an oil on canvas with dimensions of 228 x 138 centimeters. It is in the collection of MUŻA in Valletta, Malta.

== Analysis ==
It is inspired by a statue made by Michelangelo Buonarroti, at the church of Santa Maria Sopra Minerva in Rome.

== See also ==
- Risen Christ (Michelangelo)
