= Atalanta and Hippomenes =

Painting by Guido Reni

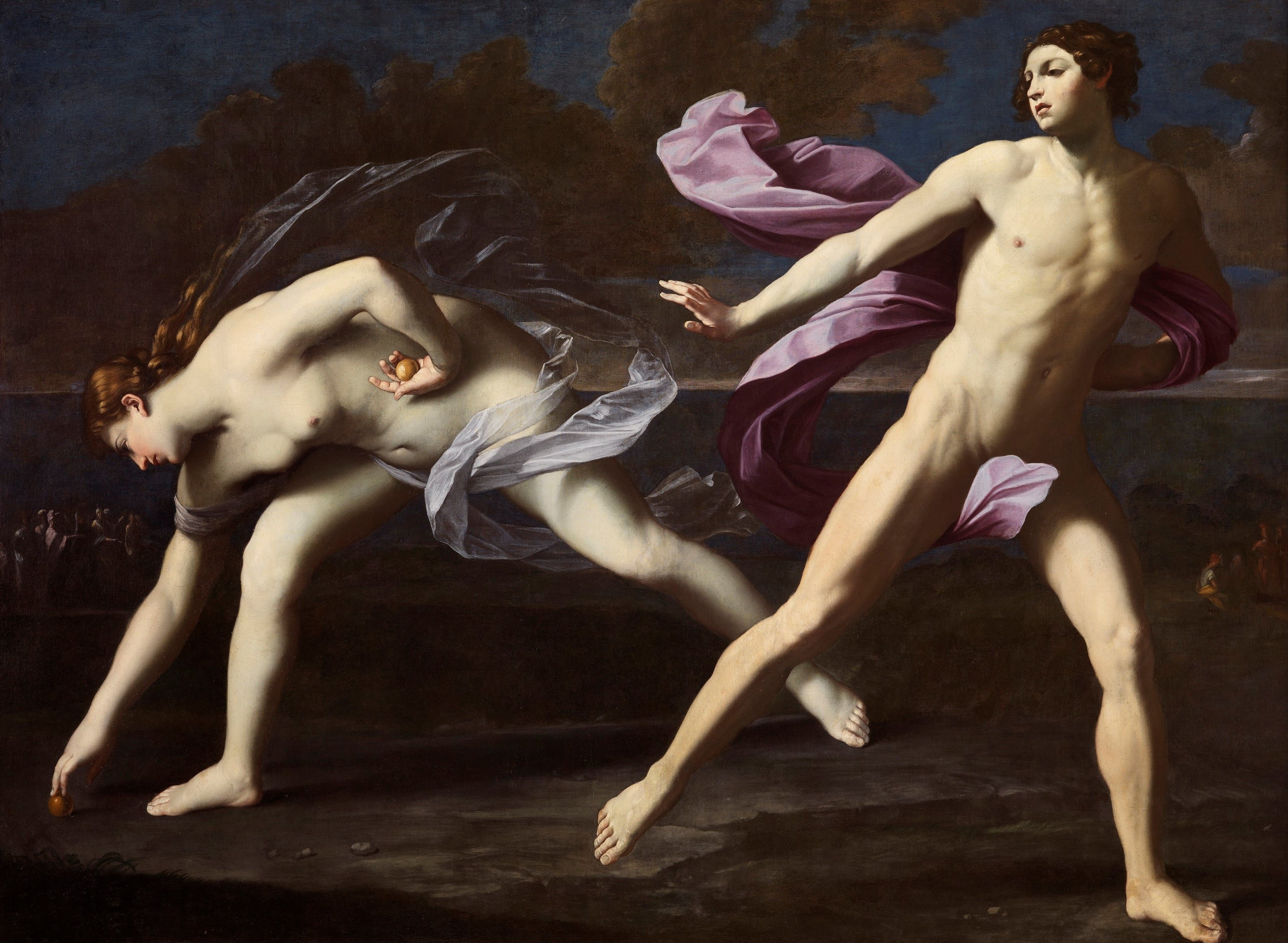
Atalanta and Hippomenes (1620–1625) by Guido Reni

Atalanta and Hippomenes is a 1620–1625 oil on canvas painting by the Italian artist Guido Reni, now in the National Museum of Capodimonte in Naples. Reni had painted a nearly identical version of the same composition in 1618–1619 which is now in the Prado Museum.
