= Massacre of the Innocents (Reni) =

Painting by Guido Reni

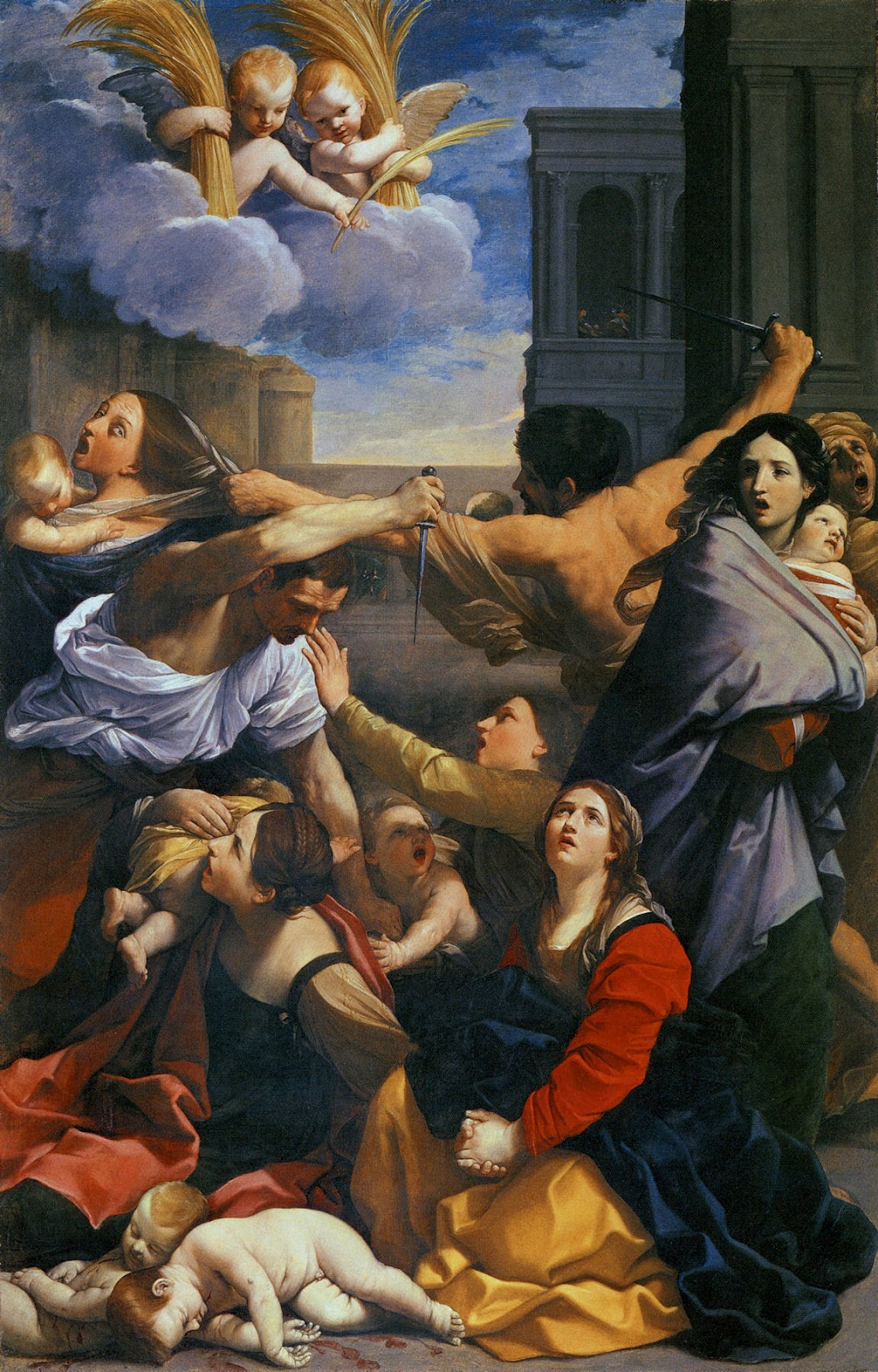
- Artist: Guido Reni
- Year: 1611
- Medium: Oil on canvas
- Dimensions: 268 cm × 170 cm (106 in × 67 in)
- Location: Pinacoteca Nazionale di Bologna; Bologna

Massacre of the Innocents is a painting by the Italian Baroque painter Guido Reni, created in 1611 for the Basilica of San Domenico in Bologna, but now in the Pinacoteca Nazionale in that same city.

== Description ==
The painting is based on the biblical episode of the Massacre of the Innocents, described in the Gospel of Matthew. The work shows a series of episodes at the same time but is classically composed with each element carefully mirrored by an answering one.

Two killer soldiers, one portrayed from behind while rushing on a screaming woman, and one kneeling towards the mothers with their children, hold knives in the right hand. The mothers are reacting in different ways: one is screaming and attempting to escape the soldiers who has grabbed her hair, another is fleeing towards the right while embracing her child, while another, in the lower left corner, is holding her child on her shoulders; another mother tries to stop a soldier with her left hand, and a kneeling woman is praying towards the sky above the children which have already been slaughtered.

A short rhyme by the contemporary Giambattista Marino inquired how such a depiction of such a violent event be beautiful art, since:

Do you not see that while the bloody/ throng of children you revive, new death you them give?/ Gentle craftsman know/ even in cruelty, you know well,/ when a tragic event can be also a dear sight,/ and often horror goes with delight.

In The World as Will and Representation, Schopenhauer wrote that Reni made a blunder in this painting by depicting figures crying out. Because painting is a mute art, Schopenhauer believed the silent portrayal of shrieking to be ludicrous, and judged that "...this great artist made the mistake of painting six shrieking, wide-open, gaping mouths."

== References and sources ==
Sources

- Wölfflin, Heinrich (1961). Renaissance et baroque. Paris: Gérard Monfort.
- Salvy, Gérard-Julien (2001). Guido Reni. Gallimard.
