= Saint Sebastian (Reni, Rome) =

Painting by Guido Reni

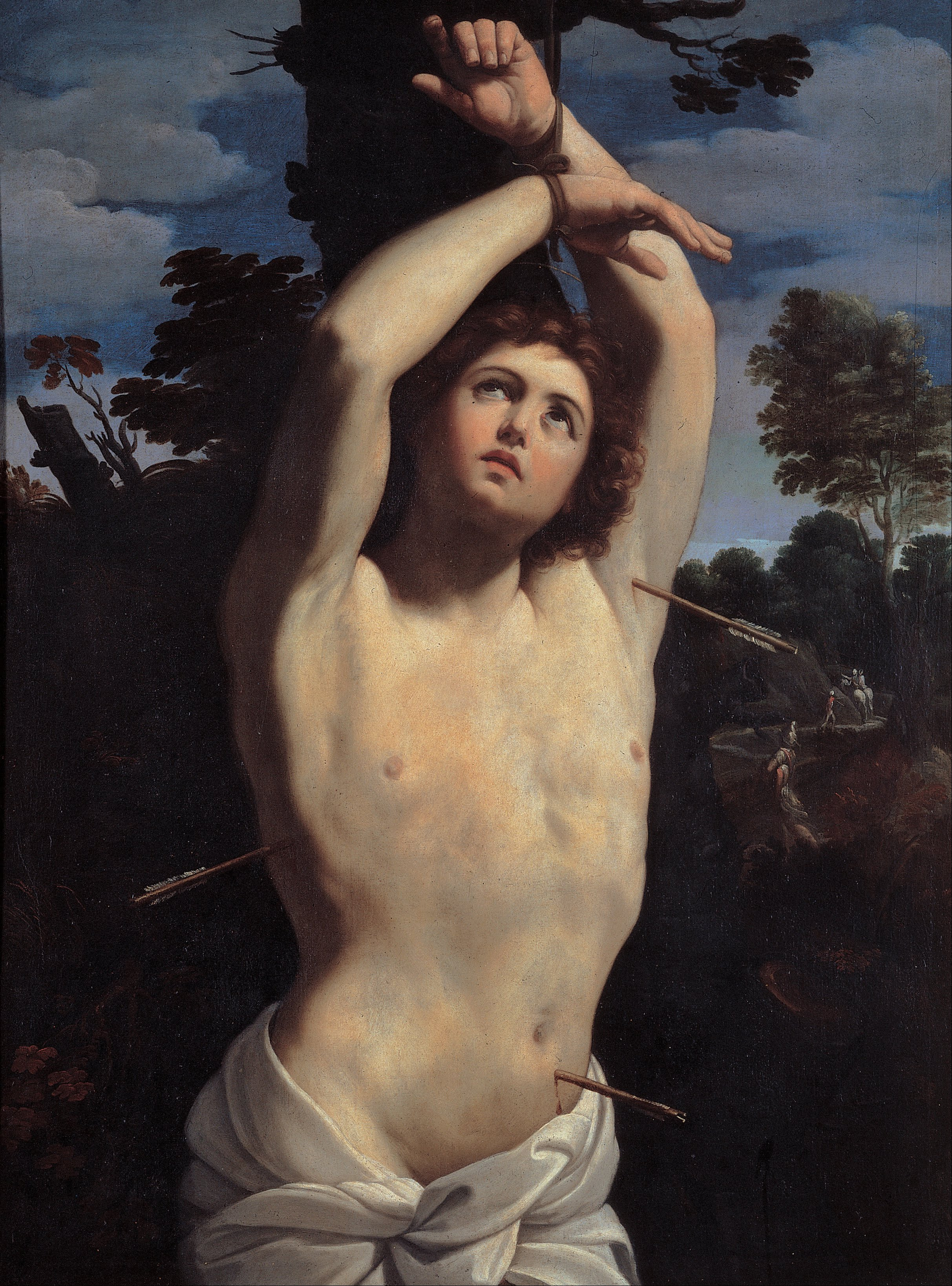
Saint Sebastian (c. 1615) by Guido Reni

Saint Sebastian is a c. 1615 oil on canvas painting by Guido Reni, now in the Capitoline Museums in Rome. It is one of three similar treatments of Saint Sebastian produced by the artist - the others are now in the Palazzo Rosso in Genoa (c. 1615) and another in the Rhode Island School of Design Museum in Providence (c. 1615 or 1630s).

== History ==
It is first recorded in the collection of cardinal Francesco Maria del Monte, who probably commissioned it. On his death in 1628 it was sold at auction of four paintings which also included Caravaggio's The Fortune Teller and John the Baptist (both now also in the Capitoline Museums) and a now-lost Orpheus by Jacopo Bassano. They were acquired together by cardinal Carlo Emanuele Pio di Savoia, remaining in the Pio collection until 1750, when it was sold to its present owner.

A similar version of this painting caused a great impression on Japanese writer Yukio Mishima.

== Other versions ==
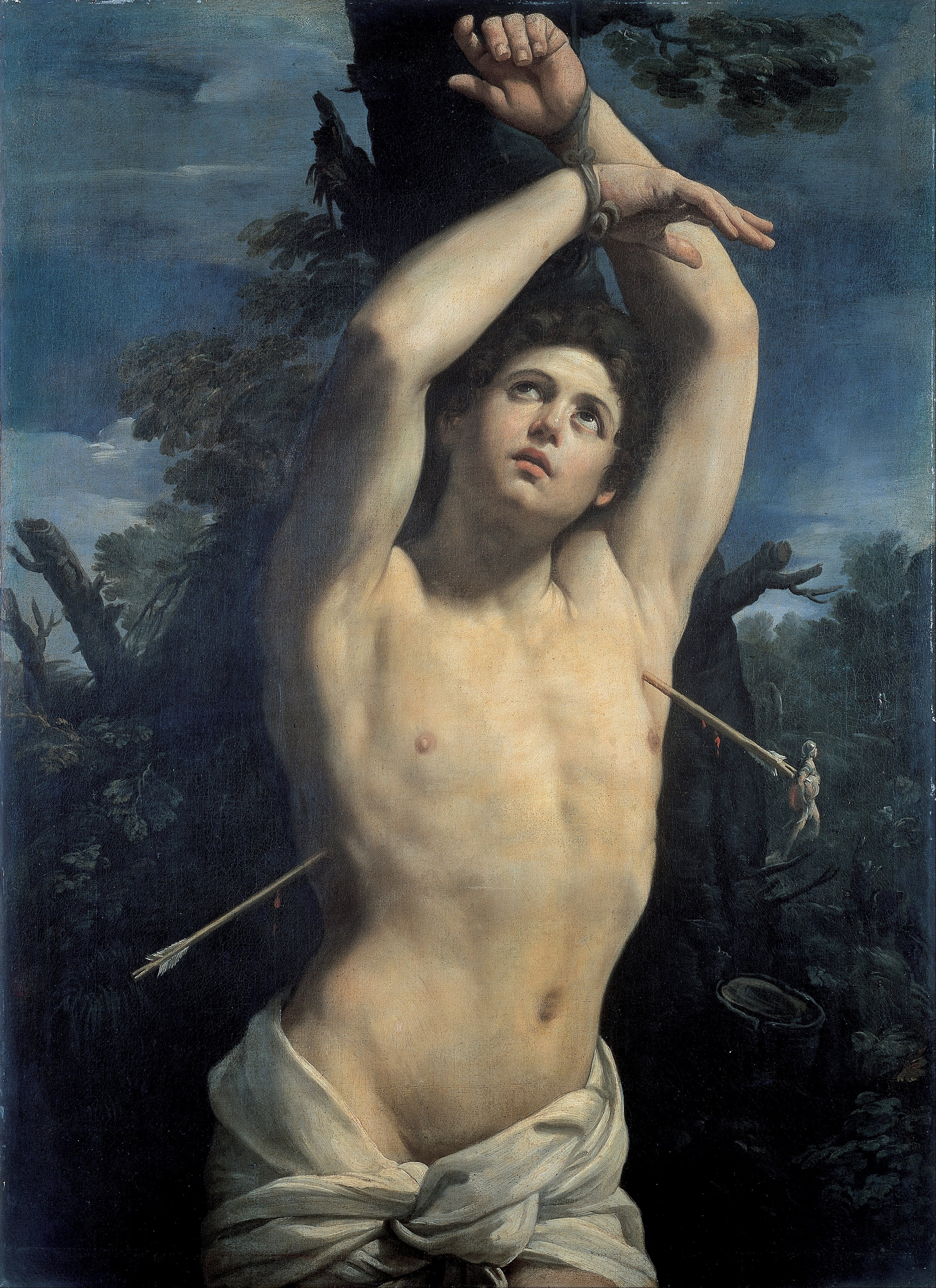
Genoa

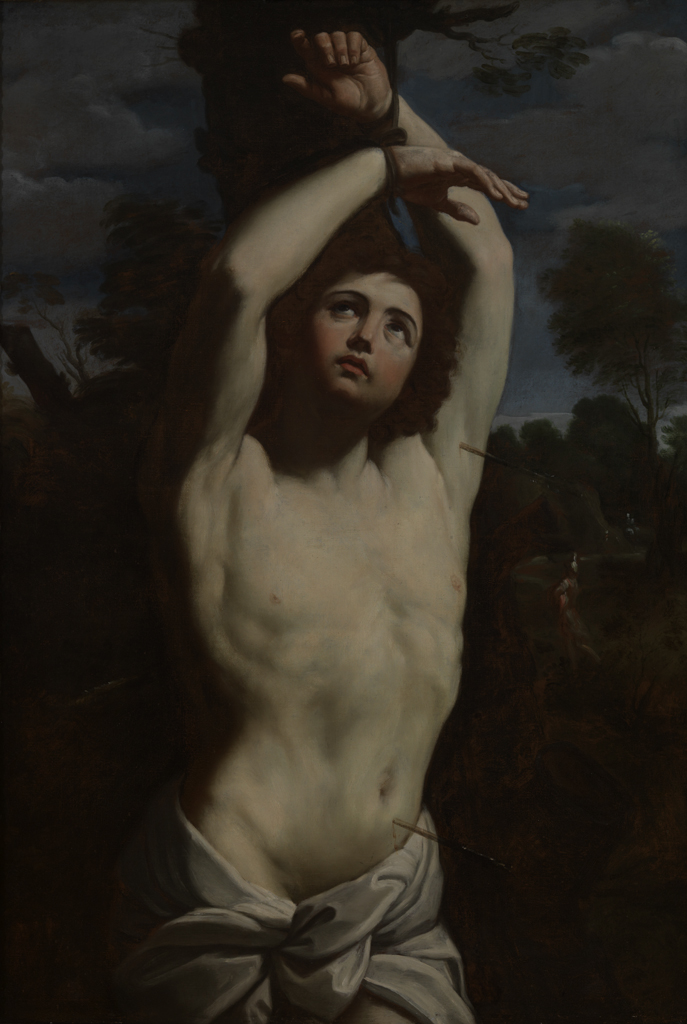
Rhode Island
