= Polyphemus (Reni) =

Painting by Guido Reni

Polyphemus (Polifemo)
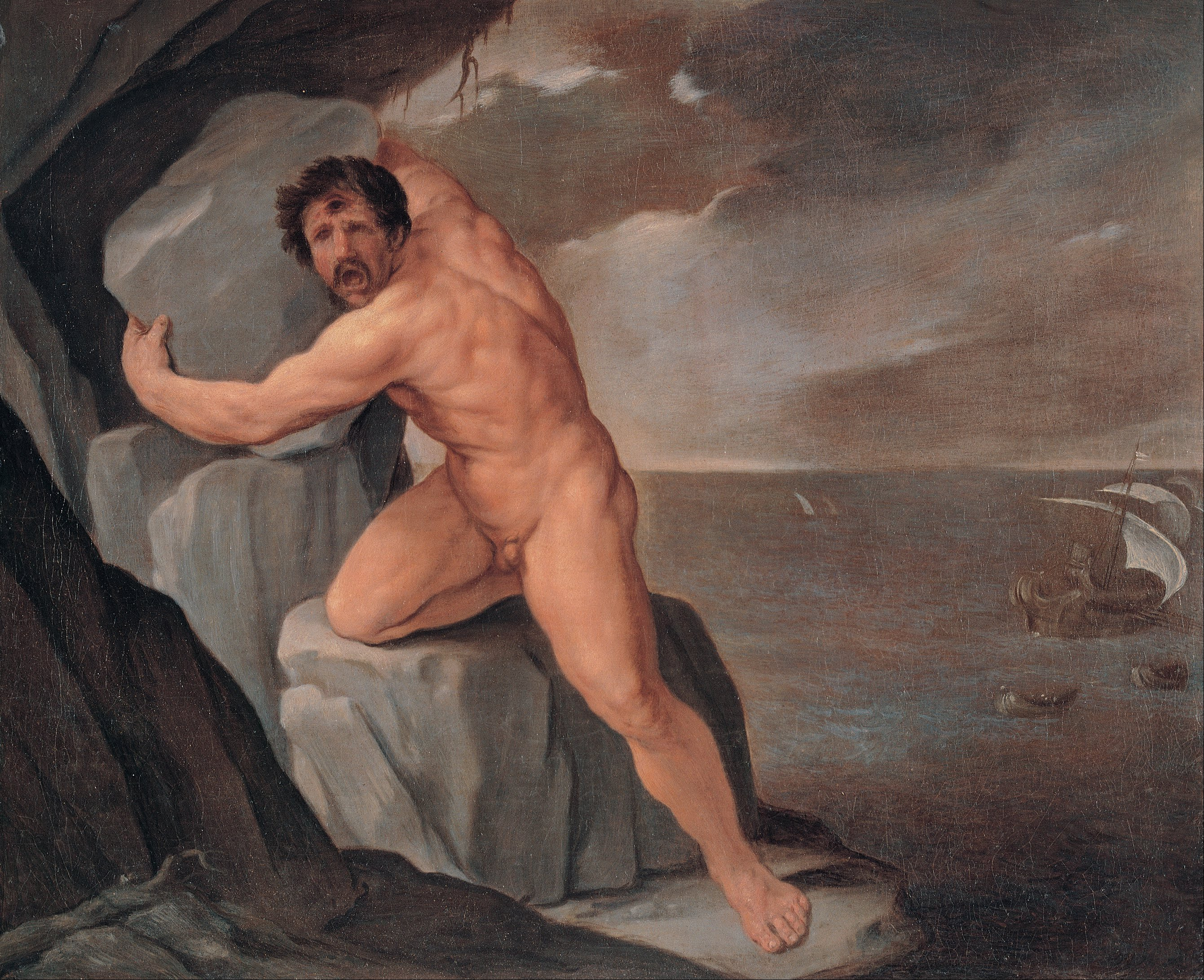
- Artist: Guido Reni
- Year: 1639–1640
- Medium: Oil on canvas
- Dimensions: 635 cm × 520 cm (250 in × 200 in)
- Location: Capitoline Museum; Rome

The Polyphemus is an oil on canvas painting by the Italian Baroque painter Guido Reni, executed in 1639–1640, and housed in the Pinacoteca of the Capitoline Museum in Rome, Italy.

== Description ==
The painting is listed in the Barberini family inventories from the 1640s through 1686, when it was listed in the property of the recently deceased Maffeo Barberini. It is soon listed in the 1688 inventory of Sacchetti, presumably Cardinal Urbano Sacchetti. By 1725, the work had made it way to the Campidoglio. The Bolognese art historian Carlo Cesare Malvasia attributed such a painting to Guido Reni. In Windsor Castle, there are two drawings signed by Reni, with dating of 1638 related to the figure of Polyphemus. Other research links this work to a lost canvas depicting Ariadne also by Reni.

The painting depicts the scene from the Odyssey where the blinded Cyclops, in anger starts to gather boulders to toss at the ships of Odysseus in the distance. He perches in a diagonal to the canvas with a gray horizon. A more active depiction of the subject had been frescoed earlier in the Gallery of the Palazzo Farnese, at which Reni had worked under Annibale Carracci.
