= Assumption of Mary in art =

Topic in Christian art history

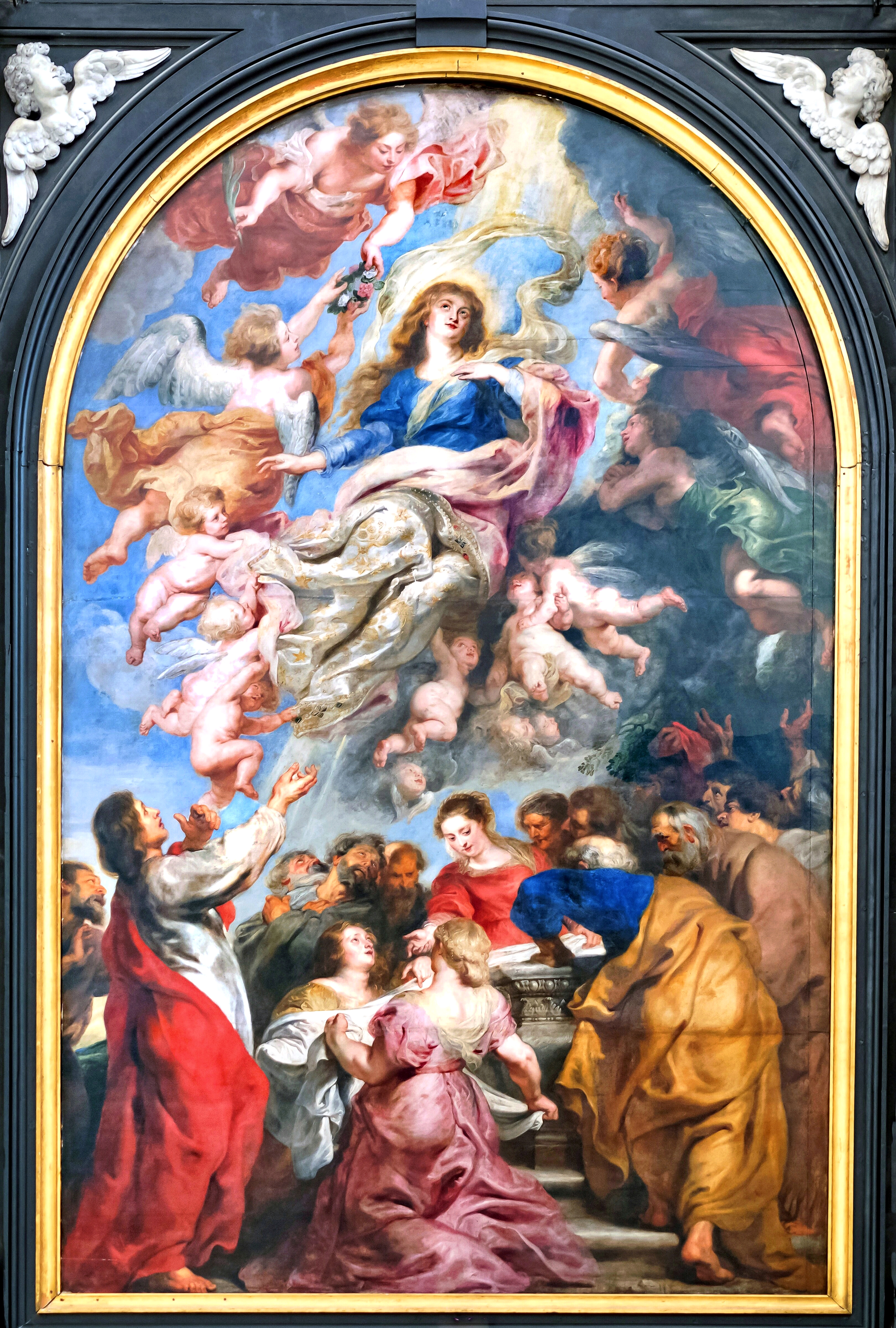
Rubens, 1626, the Cathedral of Our Lady, Antwerp

The Assumption of the Virgin Mary does not appear in the New Testament, but appears in apocryphal literature of the 3rd and 4th centuries, and by 1000 was widely believed in the Western Church, though not made formal Catholic dogma until 1950. It first became a popular subject in Western Christian art in the 12th century, along with other narrative scenes from the Life of the Virgin, and the Coronation of the Virgin. These "Marian" subjects were especially promoted by the Cistercian Order and Saint Bernard of Clairvaux (d. 1153).

Literary accounts with more detail, such as the presence of the Apostles, appeared in late medieval works such as the Golden Legend, and were followed by artists. By the end of the Middle Ages, large and crowded altarpieces gave the artist the opportunity to show his virtuosity in composition, colouring and figure poses. After the Reformation, it was used to assert the Catholic position, rejected by Protestants.

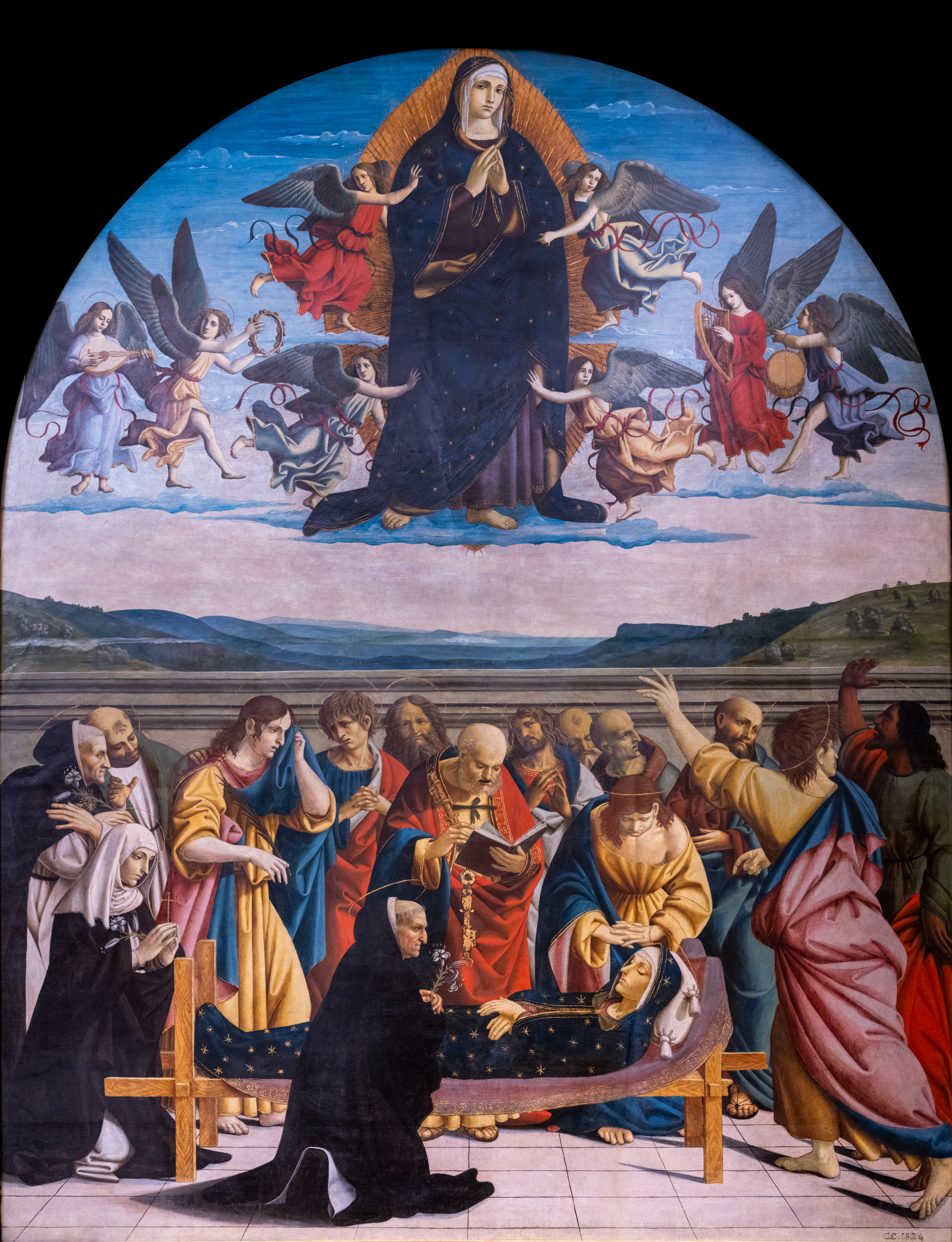
Nicola Filotesio, 1515–16, Death of the Virgin below, Assumption above.

Normally accompanied or carried by angels (but not usually carried by Christ, as in Orthodox icons) the Virgin Mary rises passively heavenward, where she is to be crowned by Christ, while the Apostles below surround her empty tomb as they stare up in awe. God the Father or Christ (as in the Orthodox Dormition) may be seen in the heavens above. She may be surrounded with an almond-shaped mandorla. Her hands are usually clasped in prayer in medieval images, but later may be thrown wide, as she gazes up, as in Titian's highly influential altarpiece for the Frari Church (1515–18) in Venice, which agitated the previously decorous apostles. Examples include works by El Greco, Rubens (several compositions), Annibale Caracci, and Nicolas Poussin, the last replacing the Apostles with putti throwing flowers into the tomb.

== Iconographic details ==
Some versions show the Virgin dropping her belt, the Girdle of Thomas, to Thomas the Apostle (best known for his Doubting Thomas episode) as she rises; this was to give him tangible proof of what he had seen, given his earlier scepticism. The "girdle" was a major relic of the Middles Ages, naturally existing in several versions. In a miniature by the Master of James IV of Scotland (1510s), an angel passes it down to Thomas. This also has the unusual scene of the funeral procession with the Apostles.

Rubens introduced two women, perhaps meant to be Martha and Mary, kneeling by the sarcophagus or bending over it. Having apparently unwrapped the shroud, they are usually holding it and collecting the roses found within. This motif was often included by later Flemish artists.

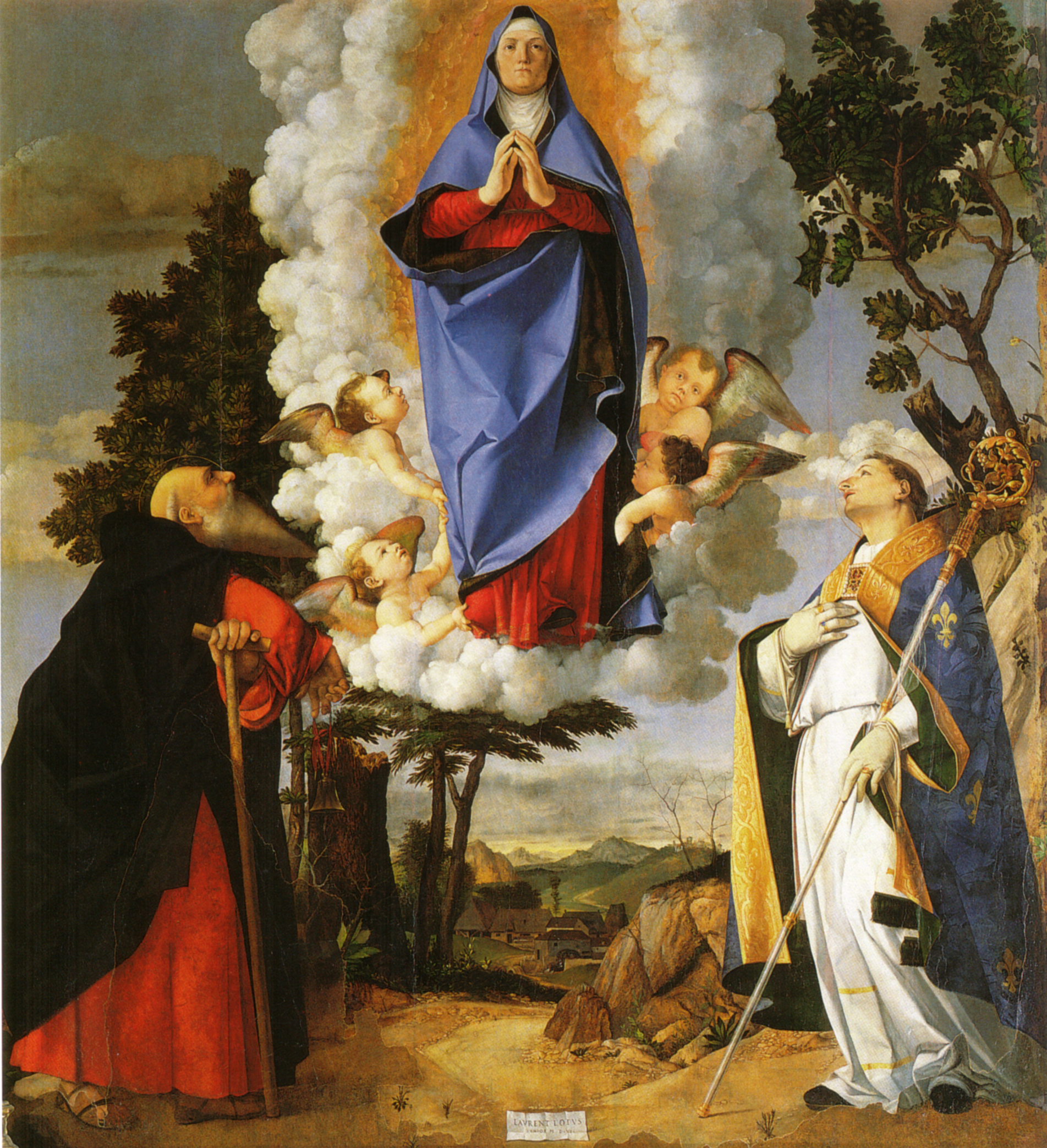
Lorenzo Lotto, 1505, Assumption with Saints Anthony Abbot and Louis of Toulouse, a sacra conversatione treatment.

Although the final age of Mary is not given in the New Testament, from the Gospel evidence she was at least in her forties, and the Golden Legend gives her age at death as sixty or seventy-two. In paintings of the Crucifixion of Jesus and the following events, she is normally depicted as a fairly old woman. But most Assumptions give her a youthful or mature appearance, with exceptions like the Panciatichi Assumption by Andrea del Sarto, of c. 1522–23. By contrast the apostles are very often depicted as old men, with the youngest, Saint John, merely in his prime. From the later 16th century some images show a more intimate depiction in the in aria type of sacra conversatione, with a few selected saints replacing the crowd of apostles, and often the Virgin hovering not much above them.

The alternative Catholic scene from the end of the Virgin Mary's early life is the Death of the Virgin, which was more compatible with the Dormition of the Theotokos in Eastern Orthodox art and theology. Most treatments showed her lying in bed, surrounded by the Twelve Apostles, again reflecting the Golden Legend. Some painters show both scenes, one above the other. Catholic doctrine, still emerging when most of these were painted, has declined to specify whether Mary had died before her bodily Assumption, although the slightly varying accounts given one after the other in late versions of the Golden Legend agree that she did, and was placed in a tomb, from which she was raised up three days later.

Though once common in Catholic art, the last major treatment of the Death of the Virgin by itself was Caravaggio's painting in the Louvre, who caused a stir by depicting her as an untidy and realistic corpse, which some considered a breach of decorum, though compatible with the doctrine of the Church.

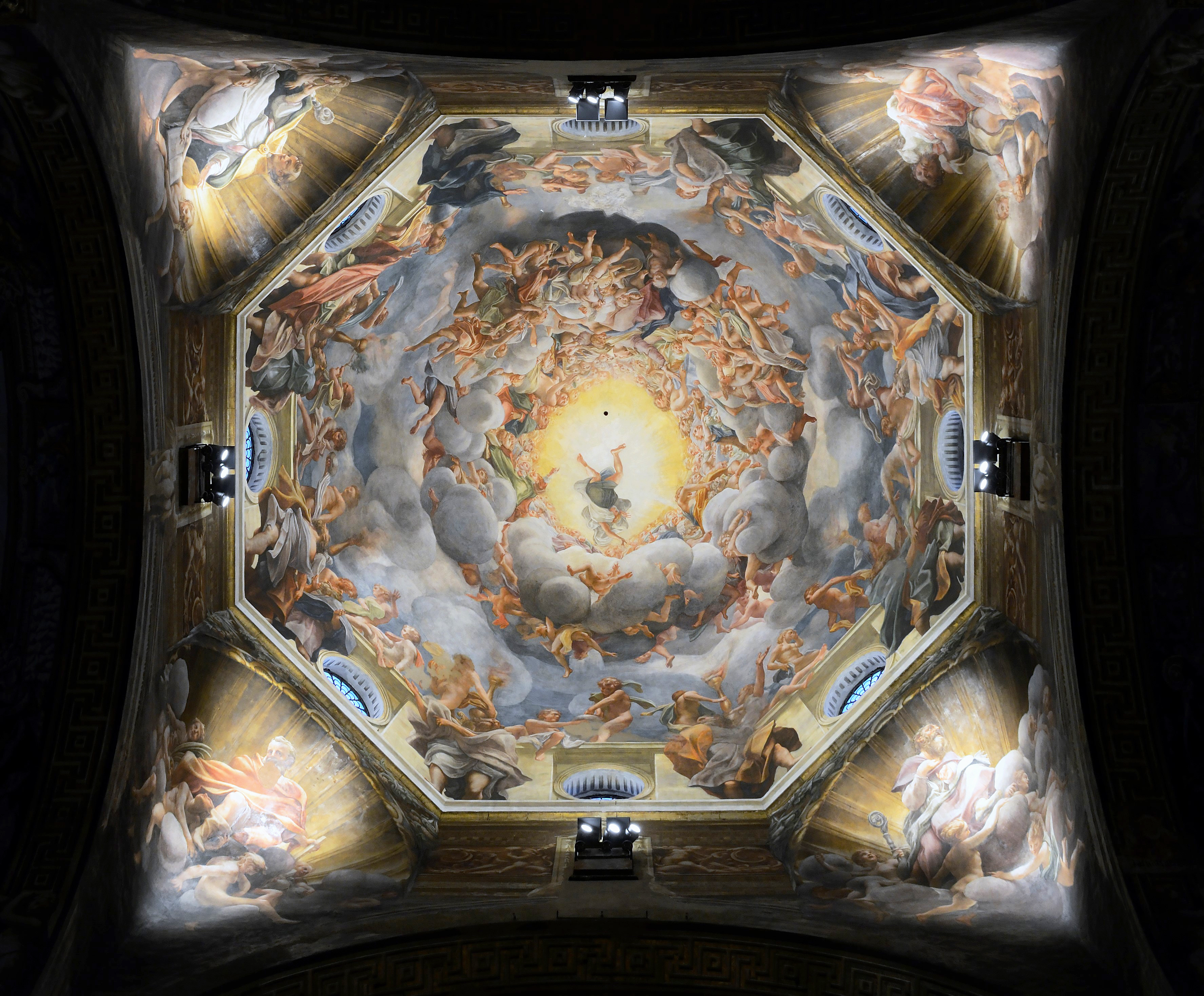
Parma Cathedral, illusionistic dome, Correggio, 1526–1530

The Assumption was a suitable subject for illusionistic ceiling paintings, and first so used at Parma Cathedral by Antonio da Correggio in 1526–1530. The first Baroque ceiling was by Giovanni Lanfranco in 1625–1627 at San Andrea della Valle in Rome.

== Selected works ==
=== With articles ===
- Assumption of the Virgin by Andrea del Castagno, 1449–1450
- Assumption of the Virgin by Francesco Botticini, 1475–1476
- Assumption of the Virgin by Pietro Perugino, 1506
- Heller Altarpiece by Albrecht Dürer, 1507–1509
- Corciano Altarpiece by Pietro Perugino, 1513
- Assumption of the Virgin by Palma Vecchio, c. 1513
- Assumption of the Virgin by Rosso Fiorentino, 1513–1514
- Assumption of the Virgin by Titian, 1515–1518
- Assumption of the Virgin by Fra Bartolomeo, c. 1516
- Panciatichi Assumption by Andrea del Sarto, c. 1522–23
- Assumption of the Virgin by Moretto da Brescia, 1524–1525
- Assumption Altarpiece by Moretto da Brescia, 1529–1530
- Assumption of the Virgin by Antonio da Correggio, 1526–1530
- Assumption of the Virgin, by El Greco, c. 1577–1579
- Assumption of the Virgin by Annibale Carracci, 1590, Museo del Prado
- Cerasi Assumption by Annibale Carracci, 1600–1601
- Assumption of the Virgin by Guido Reni, 1627, Santa Maria Assunta, Castelfranco Emilia
- Assumption of the Virgin by Guido Reni, 1637, Musée des Beaux-Arts de Lyon
- Assumption of the Virgin by Guido Reni, 1638–1639, Alte Pinakothek
- Assumption of the Virgin by Orazio Gentileschi, 1605–1608
- Assumption by Guercino, c. 1623
- Assumption of the Virgin by Peter Paul Rubens, 1626, Cathedral of Our Lady, Antwerp
- Assumption of the Virgin by Peter Paul Rubens, c. 1637, Liechtenstein Collection
- Assumption of Mary by Nikolaos Doxaras, 1725–1775

=== Other ===
- Assumption of the Virgin by Bernardo Daddi, c. 1337–1339
- Assumption of the Virgin with Saint Thomas and Two Donors (Ser Palamedes and his Son Matthew) by Andrea di Bartolo, c. 1390s
- Dormition and the Assumption of the Virgin by Fra Angelico, 1424–1434
- Assumption of the Virgin by Michelangelo di Pietro, c. 1498
- Assumption of the Virgin, with the Nativity, the Resurrection, the Adoration of the Magi, the Ascension of Christ, Saint Mark and an Angel, and Saint Luke and an Ox by Joachim Patinir, c. 1510–1518
- Assumption of the Virgin by Jacques Callot, c. 1592–1635
- Assumption of the Virgin by Giovanni Lanfranco, before 1647
- Assumption of the Virgin by Guercino, 1650, Detroit Institute of Arts
- Assumption of the Virgin by Giovanni Battista Piazzetta, 1735
- Virgin of the Apocalypse by Gaetano Gandolfi, 1770–1780
- Assumption of the Virgin, by Martin Johann Schmidt, called Kremser-Schmidt, 1773

== Gallery ==
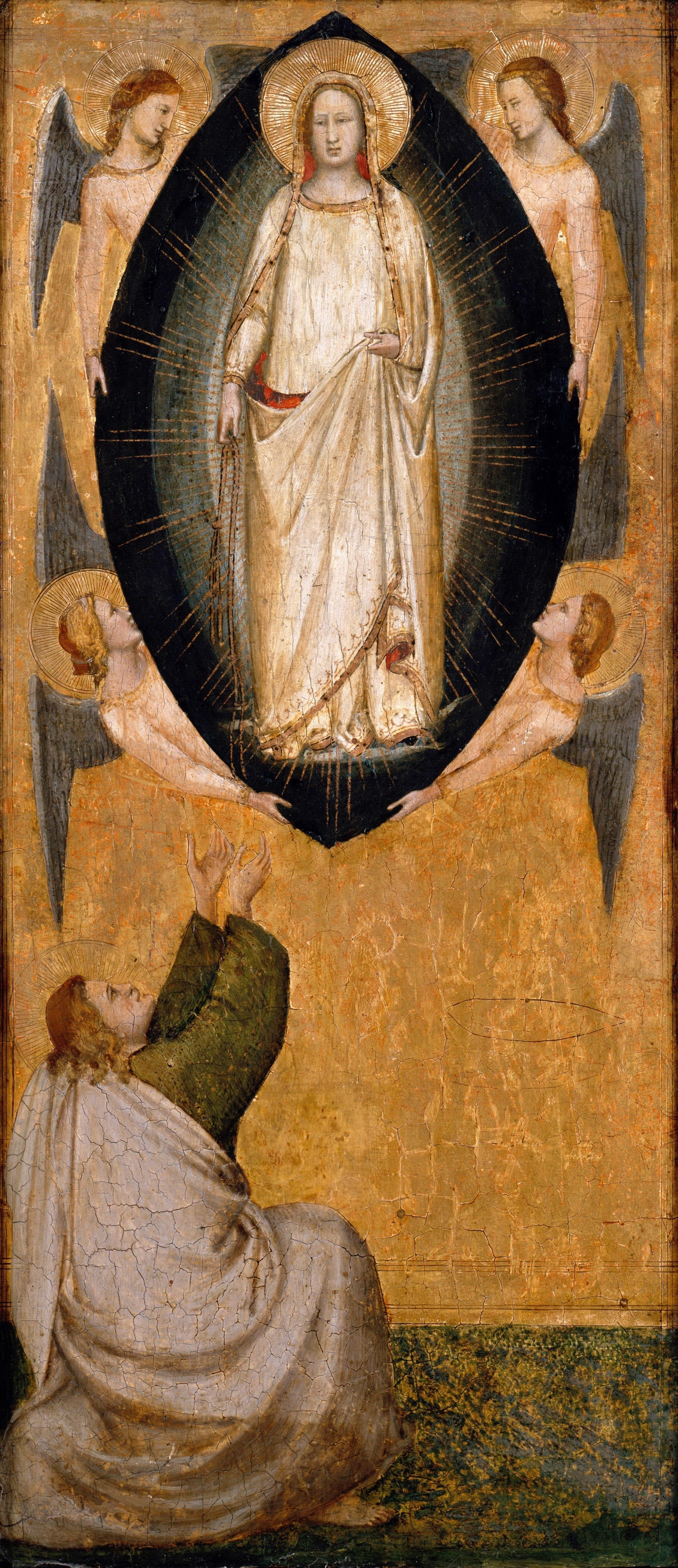
Maso di Banco, 1337–1339, Berlin. The girdle of Thomas hangs down from the Virgin's hand.

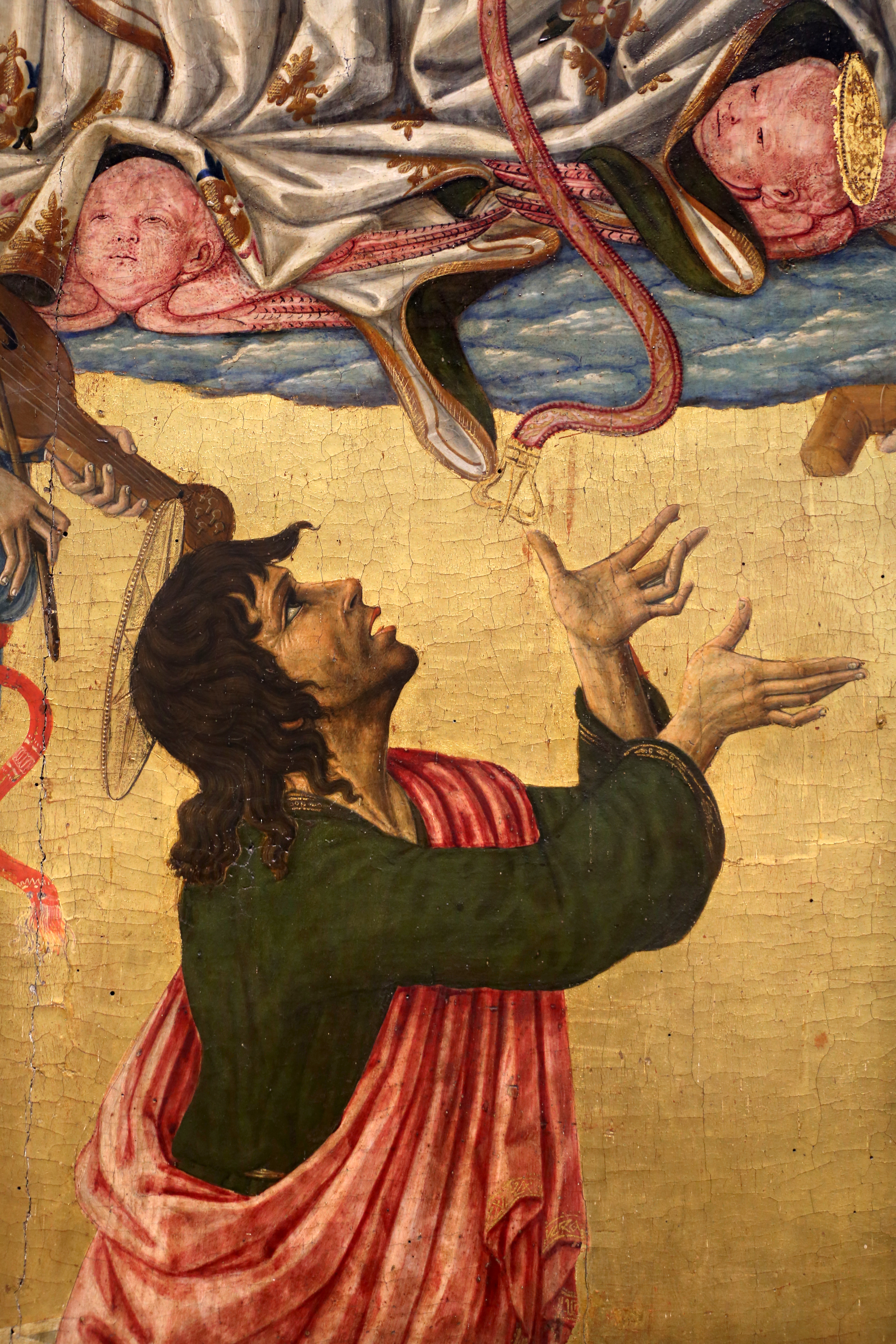
Thomas catches the belt. Detail, by Matteo di Giovanni, c. 1474.

Master of the Legend of Saint Lucy, 1485

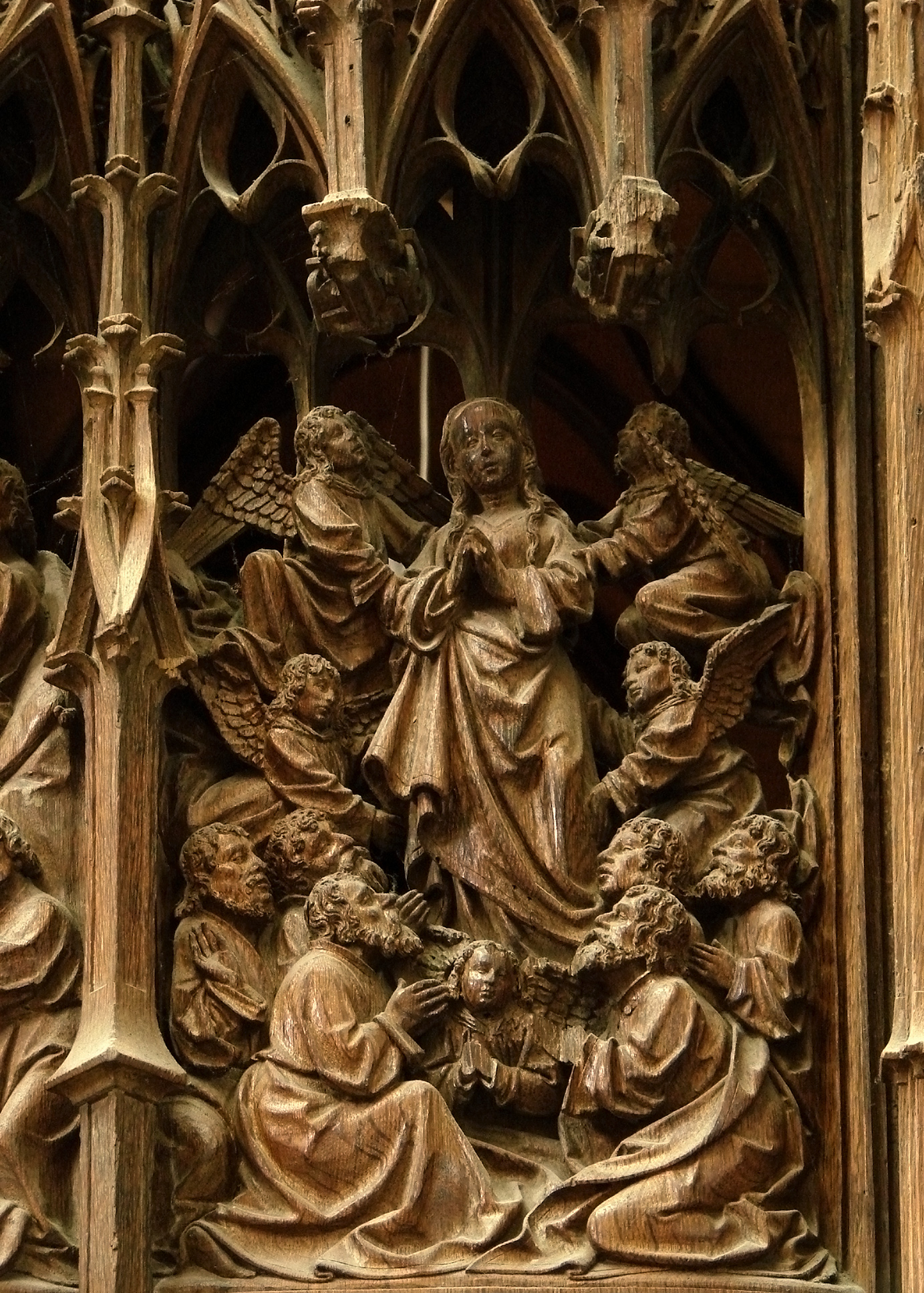
Choir stall in Amiens Cathedral, 1508–1519

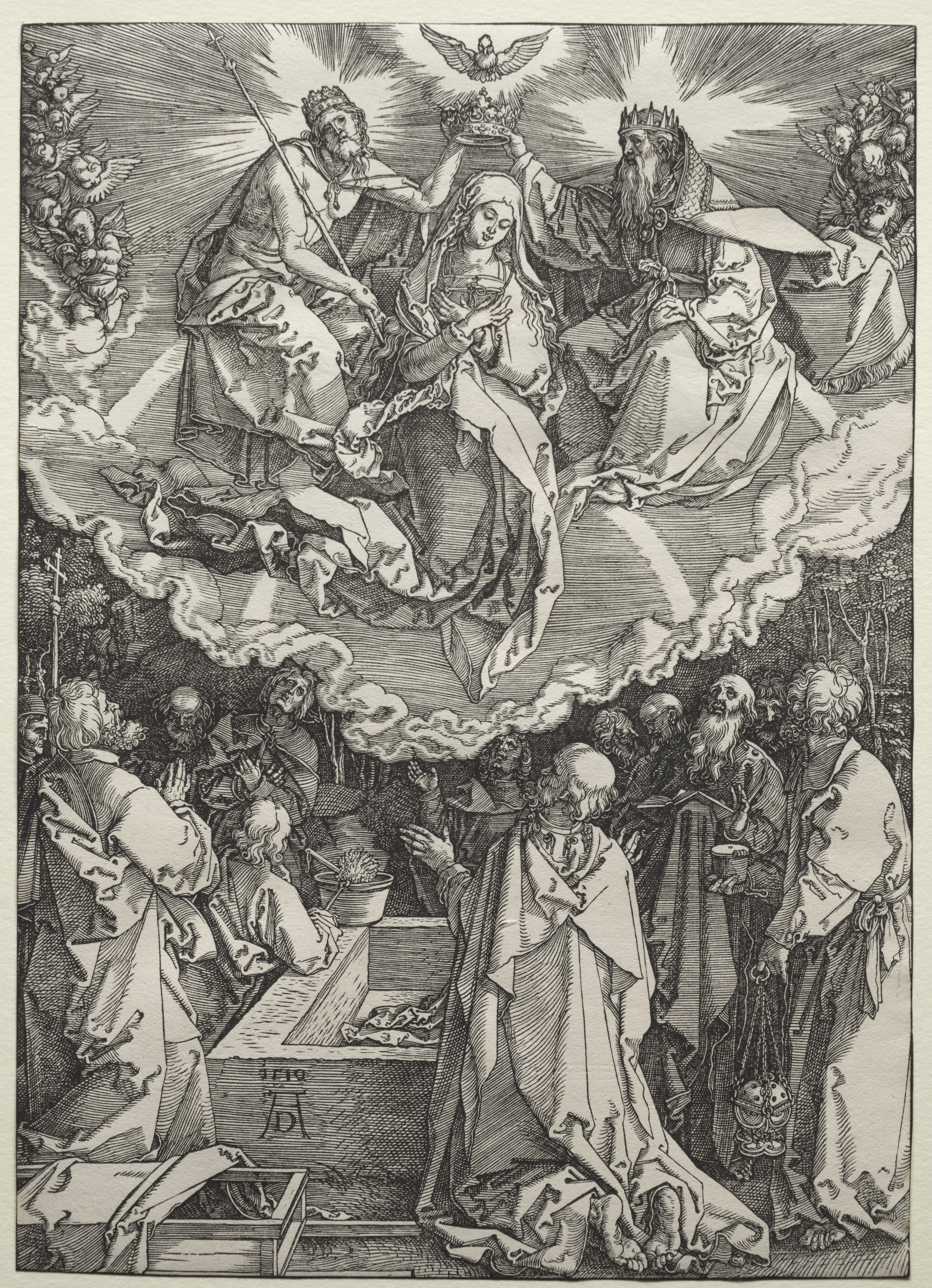
Albrecht Dürer, woodcut, 1510, combined Assumption and Coronation of the Virgin

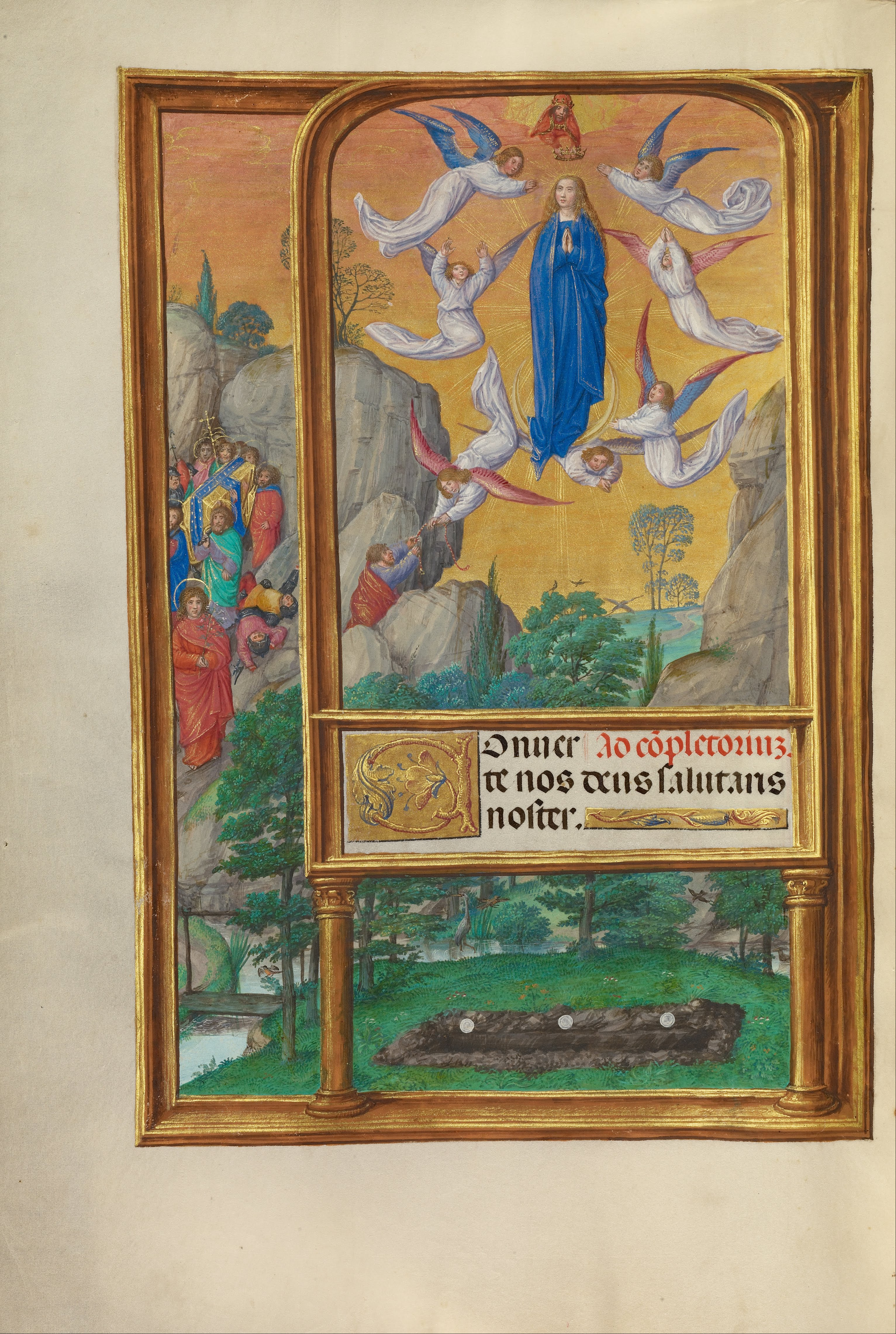
Miniature by the Netherlandish Master of James IV of Scotland, 1510s

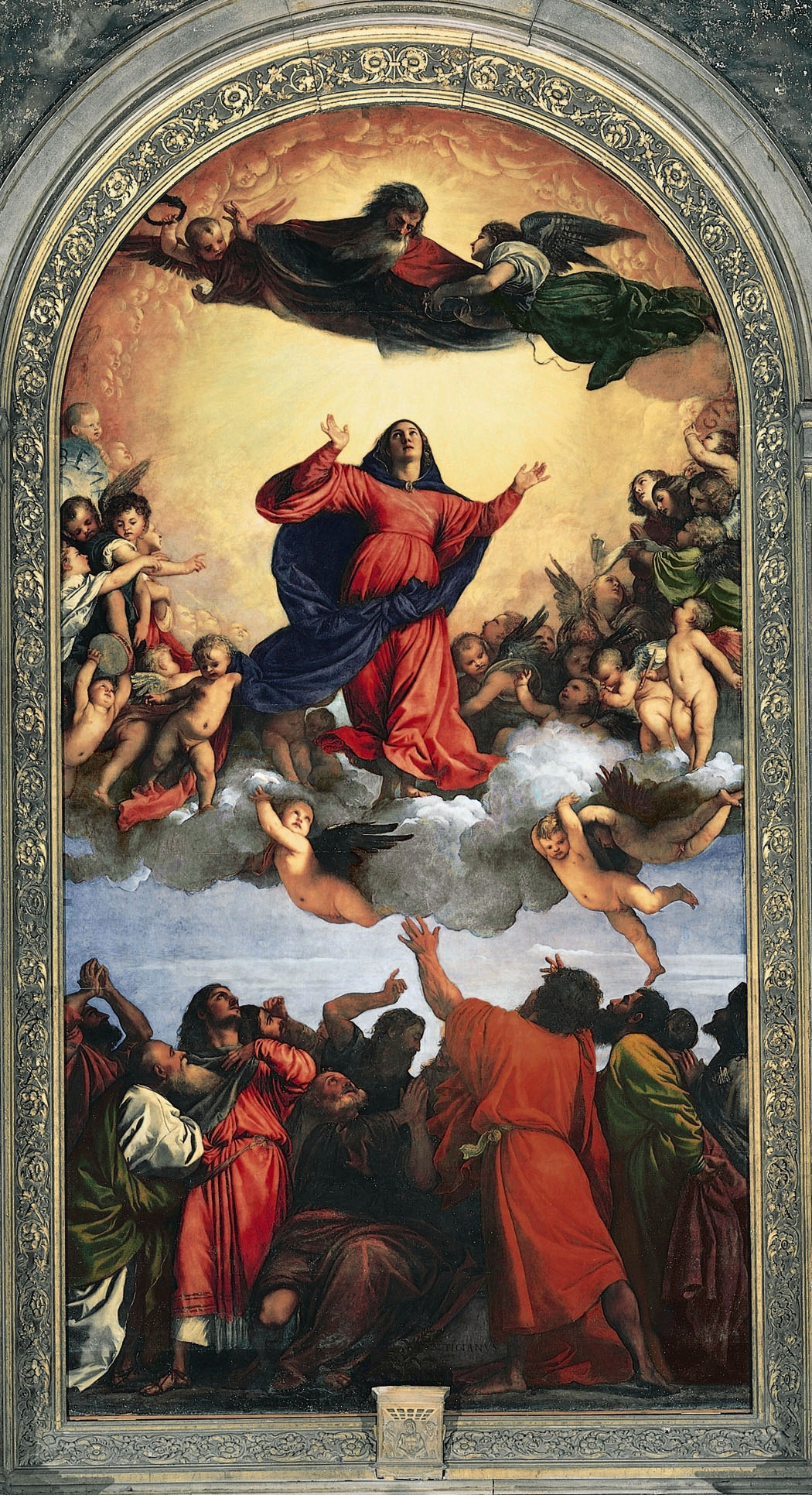
Titian Frari Assumption, 1516

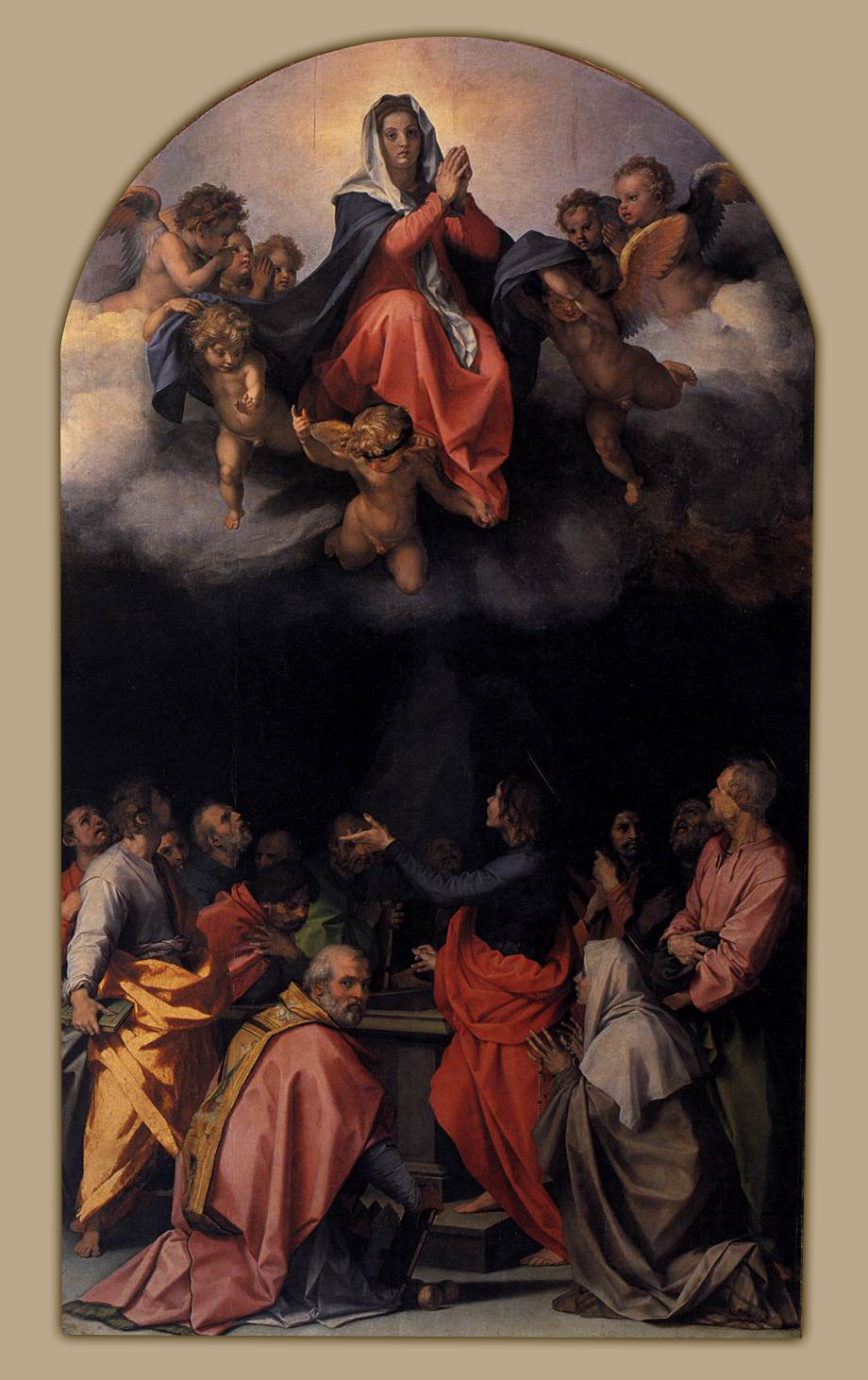
Andrea del Sarto, 1526

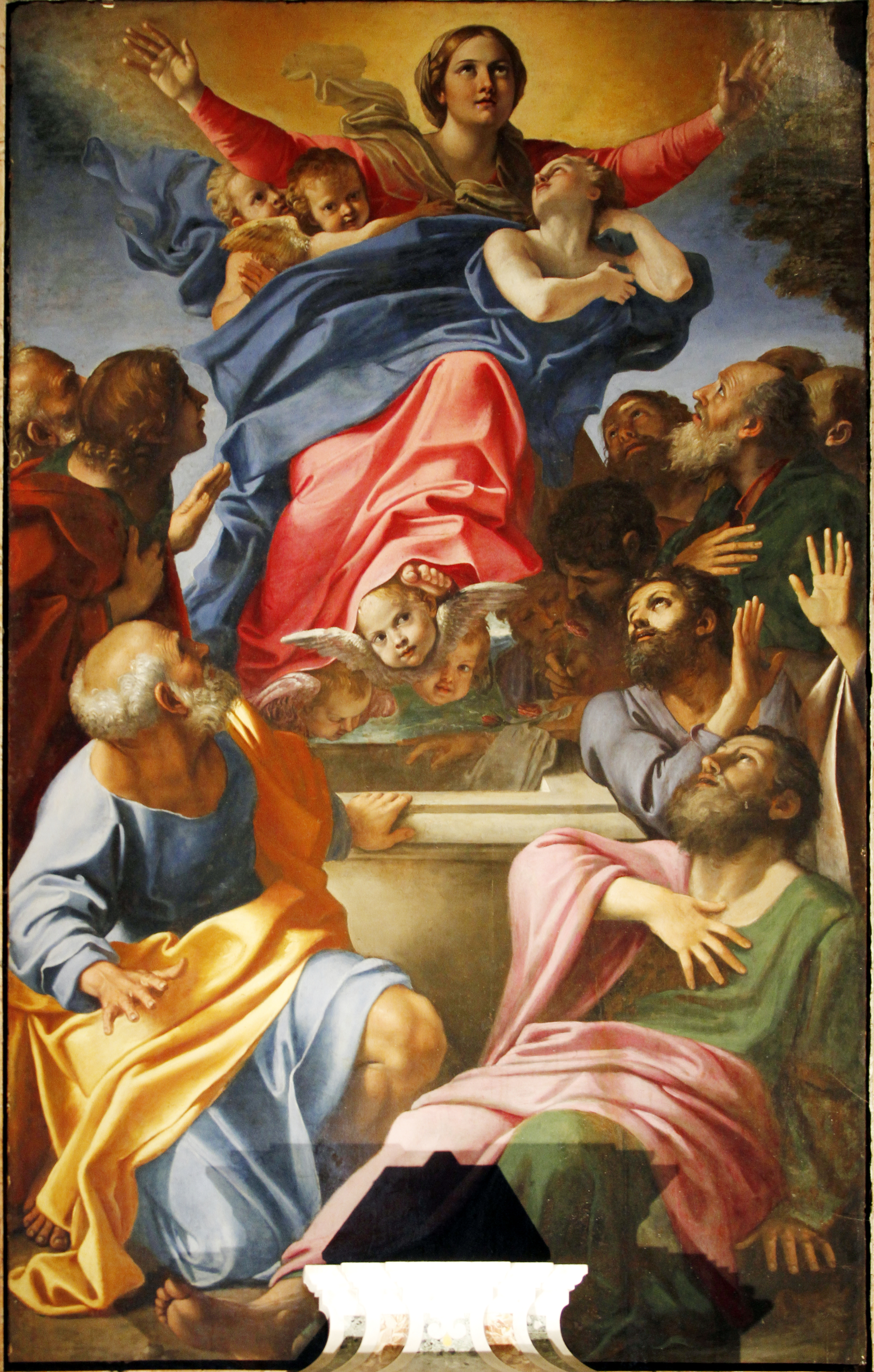
Annibale Carracci, 1600–01

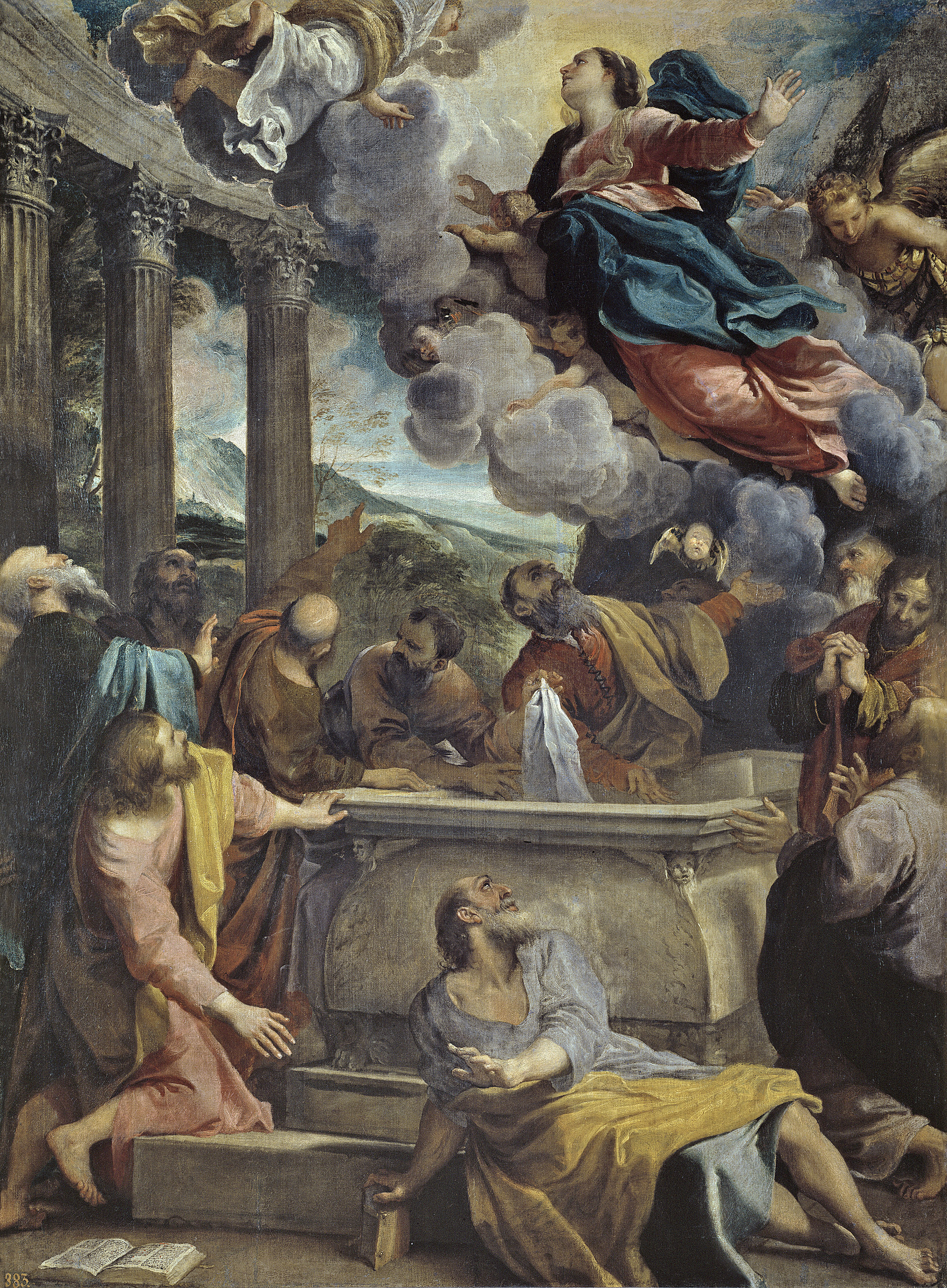
Annibale Carracci Assumption, 16th century

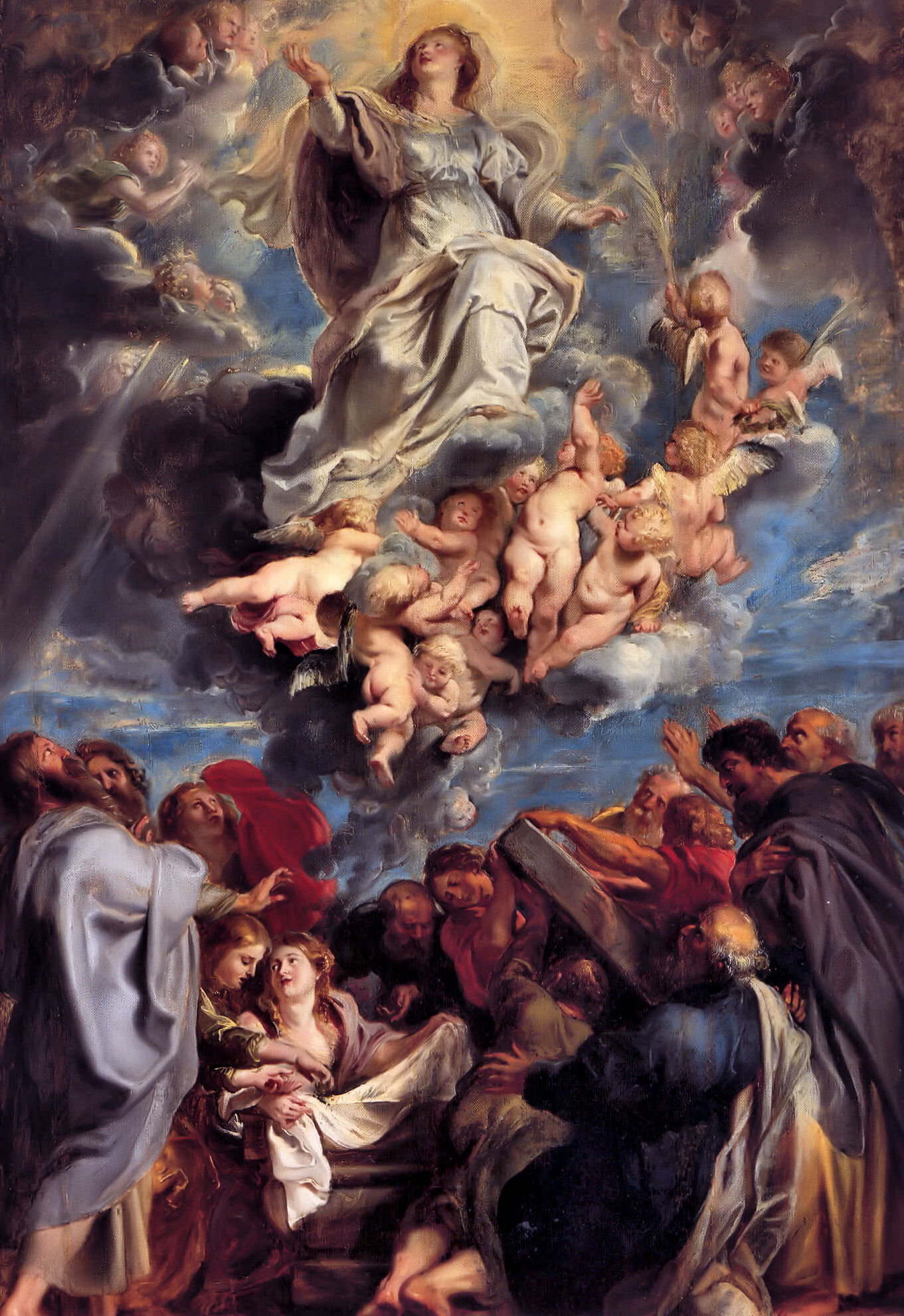
Rubens Assumption of the Virgin, 17th century

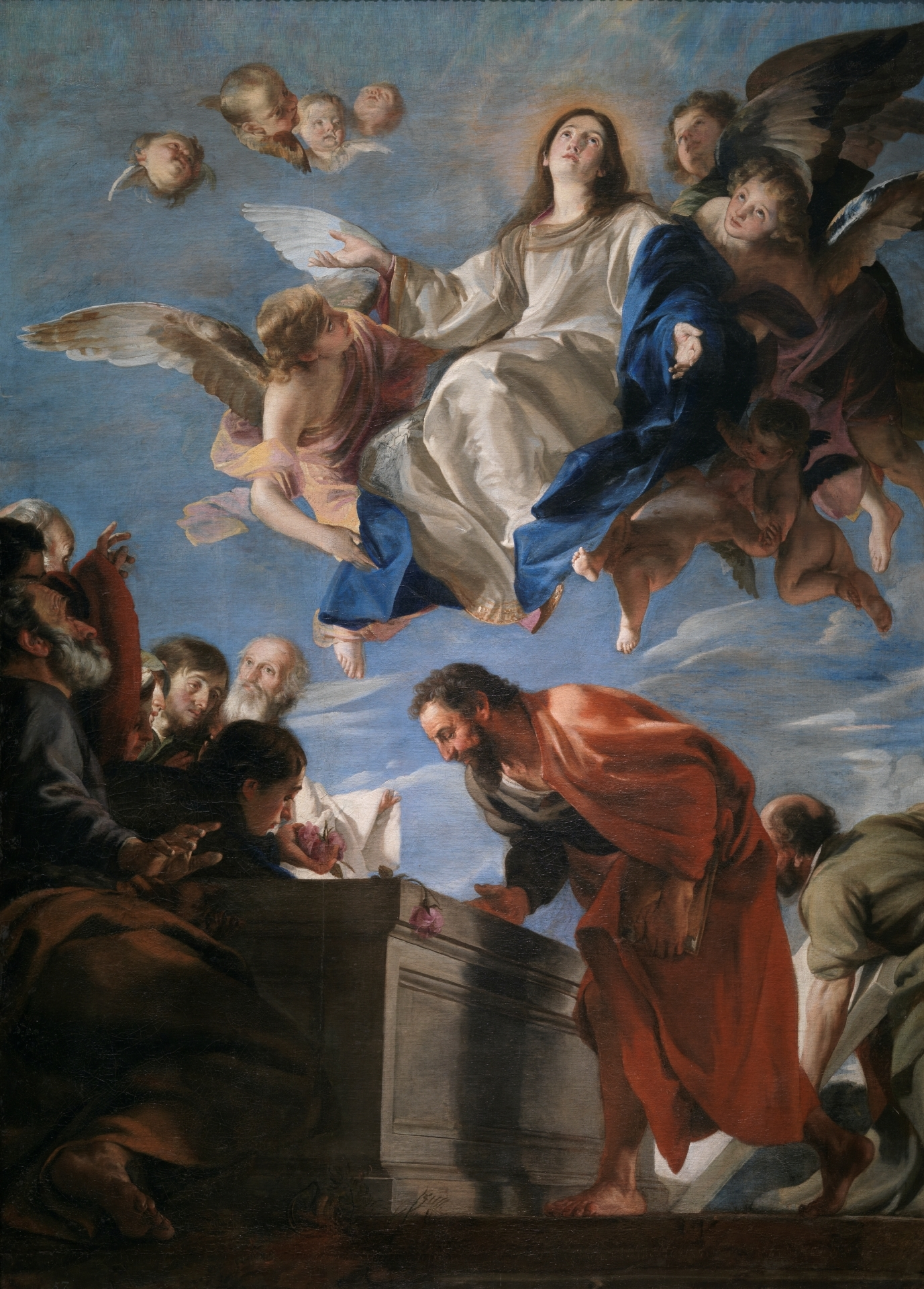
Juan Martín Cabezalero Assumption of the Virgin, c. 1665

Wilhelm Hauschild, Lochen Church, 19th century
