= Assumption of the Virgin (Rubens) =

Assumption of the Virgin may refer to one of two paintings by Peter Paul Rubens:

- Assumption of the Virgin (Rubens, Antwerp)
- Assumption of the Virgin (Rubens, Vienna)
