= Assumption of the Virgin (Reni, Castelfranco Emilia) =

Painting by Guido Reni

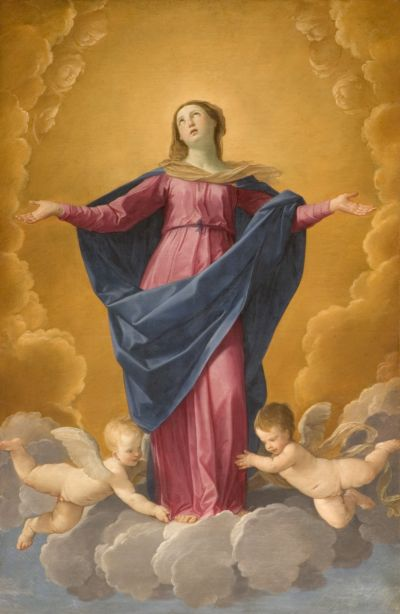
Assumption of the Virgin (1627) by Guido Reni

Assumption of the Virgin is a 1627 oil on canvas painting by Guido Reni in the church of Santa Maria Assunta in Castelfranco Emilia. A later version is now in Lyon, whilst another is in the Alte Pinakothek in Munich, whilst treatments of the Immaculate Conception are now in San Biagio in Forlì and the Metropolitan Museum of Art in New York.

== History ==
Many documents survive about the work. In his Bologna Perlustrata Antonio Masini wrote that "the very famous painting of the Assumption of the Blessed Virgin by Guido Reni was made in 1627 for Doctor Christoforo Masini, Archpriest and Vicar of the so-called Terra and introduced with a very solemn procession on 16 May", later telling of a miracle that occurred immediately due to the painting. The Doctor was a connoisseur of painting and in direct contact with one of the most sought-after masters in Europe.

Reni's studio was already very active and strictly organised to meet high demand, but in this case the painting is wholly autograph.

== Bibliography ==
- (in Italian) Sonia Cavicchioli (editor) in Ecclesia, i Beni Ecclesiastici del territorio di Castelfranco Emilia, Castelfranco Emilia, 2007, p.100
- (in Italian) Pepper S., Guido Reni, Oxford, 1984, pp 262-263; with bibliography
- (in Italian) Ghiraldi, Castelfranco Emilia. Un paese, la sua storia, la sua anima, Carnate (Milano), 2002; con bibliografia.
