= Assumption of the Virgin (Rubens, Antwerp) =

Painting by Peter Paul Rubens

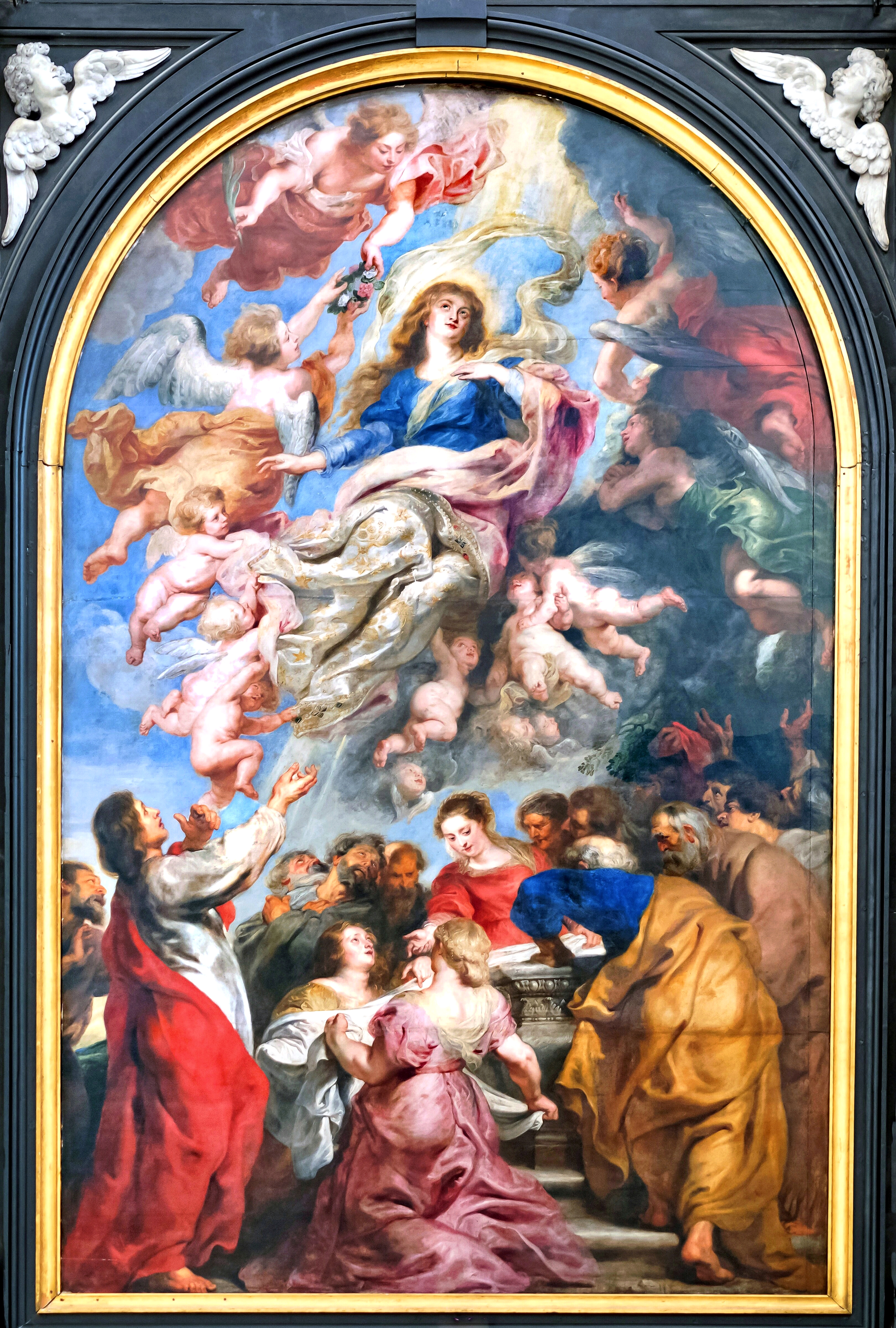
- Artist: Peter Paul Rubens
- Year: 1626
- Medium: Oil on panel
- Dimensions: 490 cm × 325 cm (190 in × 128 in)
- Location: Cathedral of Our Lady, Antwerp

The Assumption of the Virgin Mary or Assumption of the Holy Virgin, is a painting by Peter Paul Rubens, completed in 1626 as an altarpiece for the high altar of the Cathedral of Our Lady, Antwerp, where it remains.

In Rubens' depiction of the Assumption of Mary, a choir of angels lifts her in a spiraling motion toward a burst of divine light. Around her tomb are gathered 11 apostles (according to the legend that tells that Thomas was absent) — some with their arms raised in awe; others reaching to touch her discarded shroud. The women in the painting are thought to be Mary Magdalene and the Virgin Mary's two sisters. A kneeling woman holds a flower, referring to the lilies that miraculously filled the empty coffin.

The Antwerp Cathedral of Our Lady opened a competition for an Assumption altar in 1611. Rubens submitted models to the clergy on 16 February 1611. In September 1626, 15 years later, he completed the piece.

There is a smaller studio version, with some differences, in the National Gallery of Art, Washington, D.C.

Another version hangs on the right side altar of the castle church St. Peter and Paul in Kirchheim in Schwaben, Germany.

The modello of this painting is exhibited in the Mauritshuis Museum in The Hague, Netherlands.

== See also ==
- Marian art in the Catholic Church
- Assumption of the Virgin Mary in art
