= Assumption of the Virgin with Saint John the Baptist and Saint Catherine of Alexandria =

Painting by Fra Bartolomeo

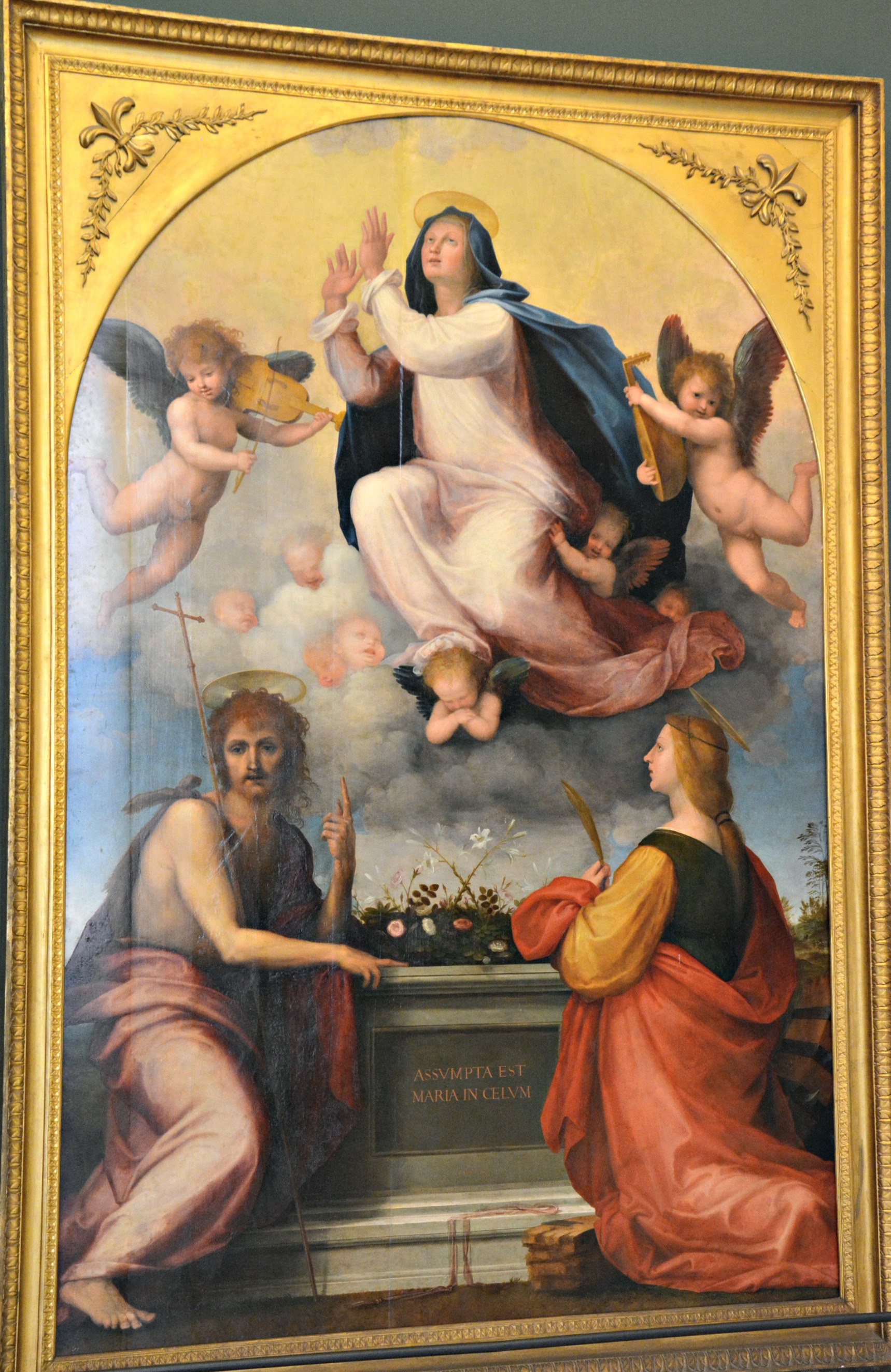
- Artist: Fra Bartolomeo
- Year: c. 1516
- Medium: oil on wood
- Dimensions: 311 cm × 201 cm (122 in × 79 in)
- Location: National Museum of Capodimonte, Naples

Assumption of the Virgin with Saint John the Baptist and Saint Catherine of Alexandria is an oil-on-panel painting by the Italian Renaissance painter Fra Bartolomeo, created c. 1516, commissioned by the church of Santa Maria in Castello in Prato. To the left of the Virgin's tomb is John the Baptist, whilst to the right is Catherine of Alexandria. It is now in the National Museum of Capodimonte in Naples.

It was confiscated from San Luigi dei Francesi in Rome in 1800 and acquired by Domenico Venuti for the Bourbon collection.

== History and description ==
The altarpiece, mentioned by Giorgio Vasari, was presumably made in 1516, a date that according to sources was reported on the work. It was commissioned for the church of Santa Maria in Castello in Prato. In 1800 it was confiscated in Rome from the deposit of the church of San Luigi dei Francesi, and purchased by Domenico Venuti, becoming part of the Bourbon collection. Later it was exhibited in the National Museum of Capodimonte, in the room 10.

The work maintains the typical canons of Fra Bartolomeo: a symmetrical composition and the use of soft colors of the devotional painting wished by the painter, inspired by the models of Raphael. At the center is depicted the Assumption of Mary, whose preparatory drawing is kept in the Uffizi Gallery, in Florence, surrounded by angels, while at her feet, on the left, kneeling and leaning against the tomb with flowers inside, is John the Baptist, a figure who differs from the rest of the work, mostly inspired by the painting of Leonardo da Vinci, whilst to the right is Catherine of Alexandria. The upper part of the table is characterized by a gold background, a technique developed by the artist during his stay in Venice in 1508.

== Sources ==
- Info
