= Assumption of the Virgin (Perugino) =

1506 painting by Pietro Perugino

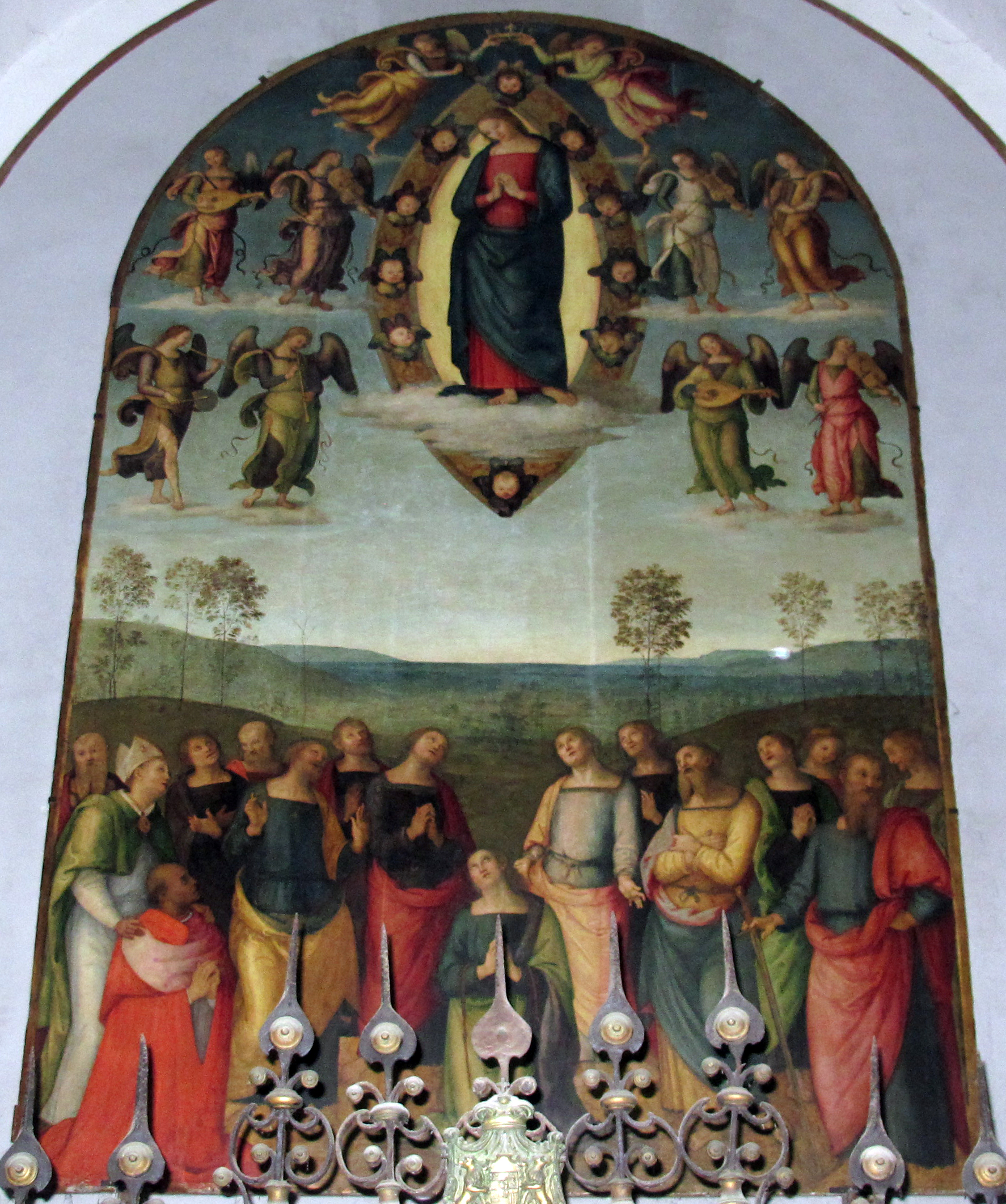
- Artist: Perugino (possibly with studio assistance)
- Year: 1506
- Medium: Tempera on panel
- Dimensions: 500 cm × 300 cm (200 in × 120 in)
- Location: Naples Cathedral

Assumption of the Virgin is a religious painting by Perugino, showing the Assumption of Mary, dating to 1506 and housed in the Seripandi side chapel of Naples Cathedral. It was restored between 2001 and April 2004. It uses much the same composition as the 1513 Corciano Altarpiece on the same theme.

It is first documented in Lives of the Artists by Vasari, in which he writes "[Perugino] painted a high altarpiece for cardinal Carafa of Naples, an Assumption of the Virgin with the apostles gathered around the tomb". The attribution and dating of the work has been heavily debated. Doubts were expressed by Cavalcaselle (1864), Venturi (1913) and Umberto Gnoli (1923), who all felt that the work was largely by his studio assistants. Bernard Berenson reconsidered the attribution to Perugino alone and in 1960 Molatoli re-ascribed the work mainly to the master's hand, with some collaboration from his assistants, possibly including Giovanni Battista Caporali.

Vasari identified the commissioner as Oliviero Carafa, but in 1624 Cesare d’Engenio instead stated that the commissioner was Vincenzo Carafa. In 1959 Franco Strazzullo returned to Oliviero, showing that he was the kneeling figure portrayed beside the apostles by comparison with his depiction in Filippino Lippi's Annunciation in the Carafa chapel in Santa Maria Sopra Minerva, Raphael's Disputation of the Holy Sacrament and the statue of Oliviero in Naples Cathedral.
