= Michelangelo di Pietro =

Italian painter

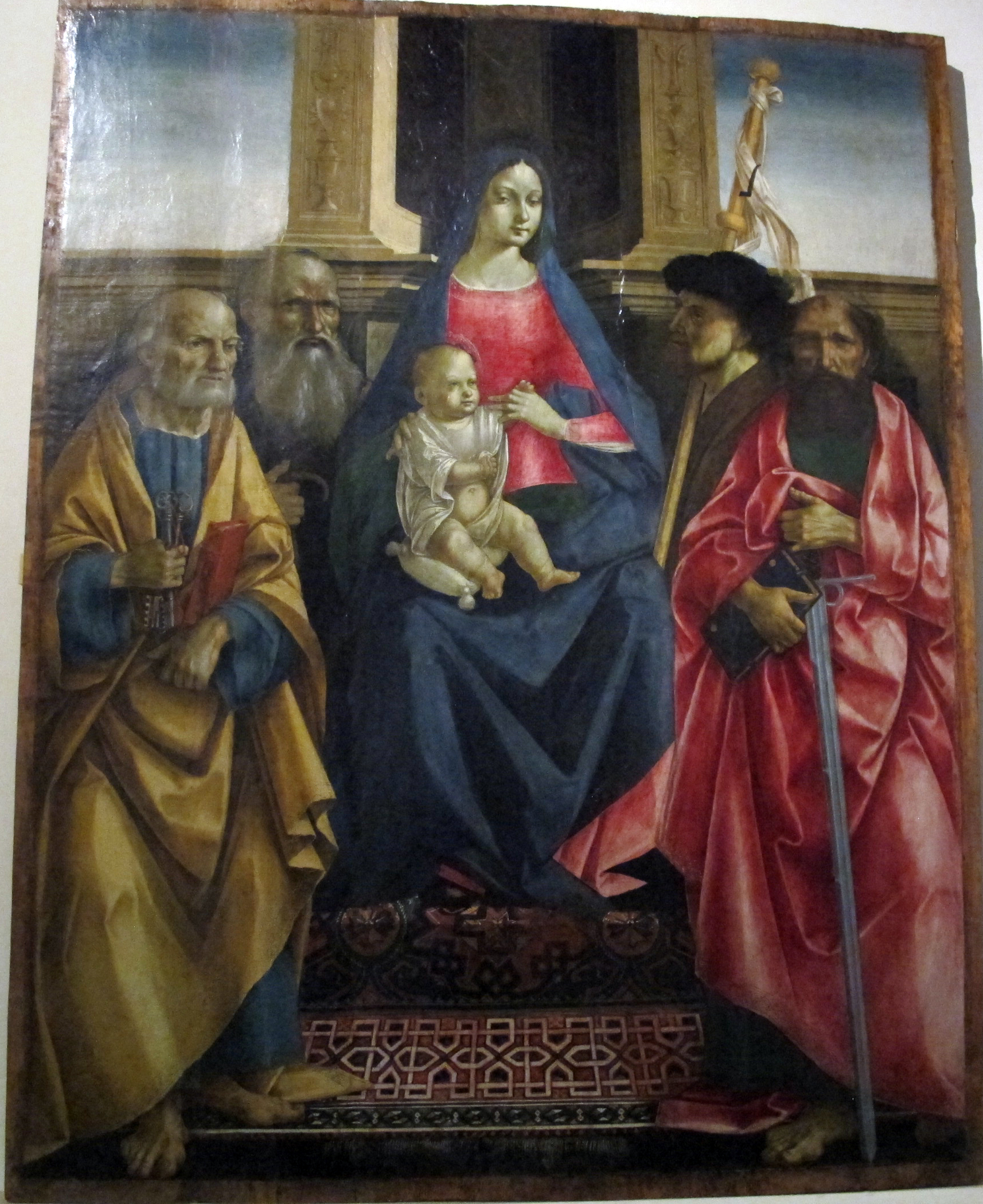
Madonna Enthroned with Saints by Michelangelo di Pietro, 1495-1500

Michelangelo di Pietro, also Michelangelo di Pietro Membrini and Master of the Lathrop Tondo, (active 1490–1520) was an Italian painter. His exact dates of birth and death are not known.

The artist was previously only known as the Master of the Lathrop Tondo, until the works could be attributed to Michelangelo di Pietro in 1985. His works are characterized by an enameled, metallic finish and a decorative, linear Florentine School style. There is now approximately thirty paintings that have been attributed to him. He is known to have worked in and around Lucca. Apparent influences include Domenico Ghirlandaio and Filippino Lippi. The parish church of Santa Maria Assunta houses a fifteenth-century altarpiece painted by Michelangelo di Pietro.
