= Master of the Legend of Saint Lucy =

Unidentified Early Netherlandish painter from Bruges

The Master of the Legend of Saint Lucy (fl. 1480–1510) was an unidentified Early Netherlandish painter from Bruges. His provisional name comes from an altarpiece in the church of Saint James in Bruges, dated 1480, depicting three scenes from the life of Saint Lucy. Twenty-five to thirty-five paintings have been attributed to the same hand. Many of his paintings are characterized by views of the city of Bruges in the background, and can be dated according to the level of construction of its belfry.

The artist may have trained with Dieric Bouts, and was certainly influenced by Hans Memling. Art historians Hulin de Loo and Max Jakob Friedländer studied the artist's work in the 1920s. They found signs of various influences, including from Bouts and Memling, other Flemish painters such as Hugo van der Goes, Van der Weyden and Van Eyck, and possibly Spanish art. He may have trained Spanish students at his studio in Bruges. He has been associated with the Bruges master Fransois vanden Pitte, active in Bruges between 1453 and 1456.

As well as depictions of the Bruges skyline and an identifiable landscape style, other distinguishing features of this artist’s hand include pomegranate motifs, and women with oval faces, large eyelids, and long, wavy hair.

== Selected attributed works ==
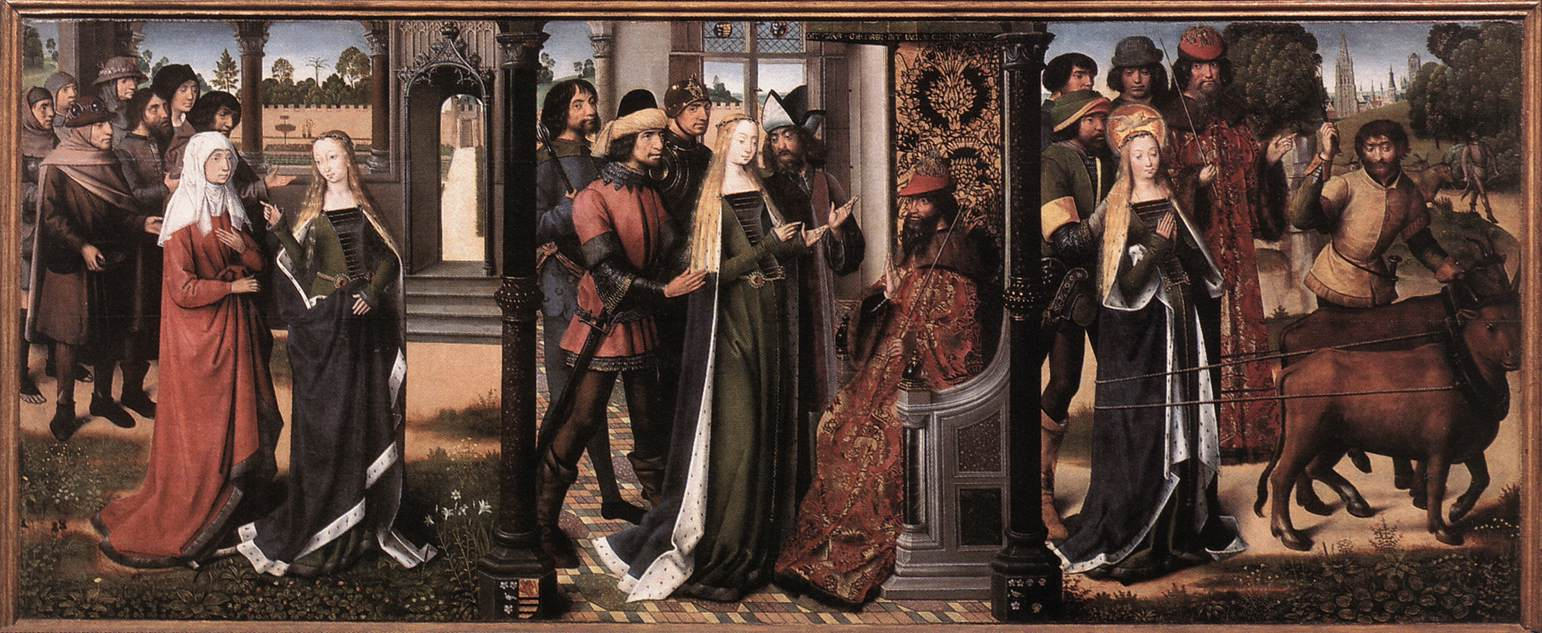
Legend of St Lucy (1480), altarpiece of Saint James church, Bruges

Mary, Queen of Heaven (c. 1480–1510)
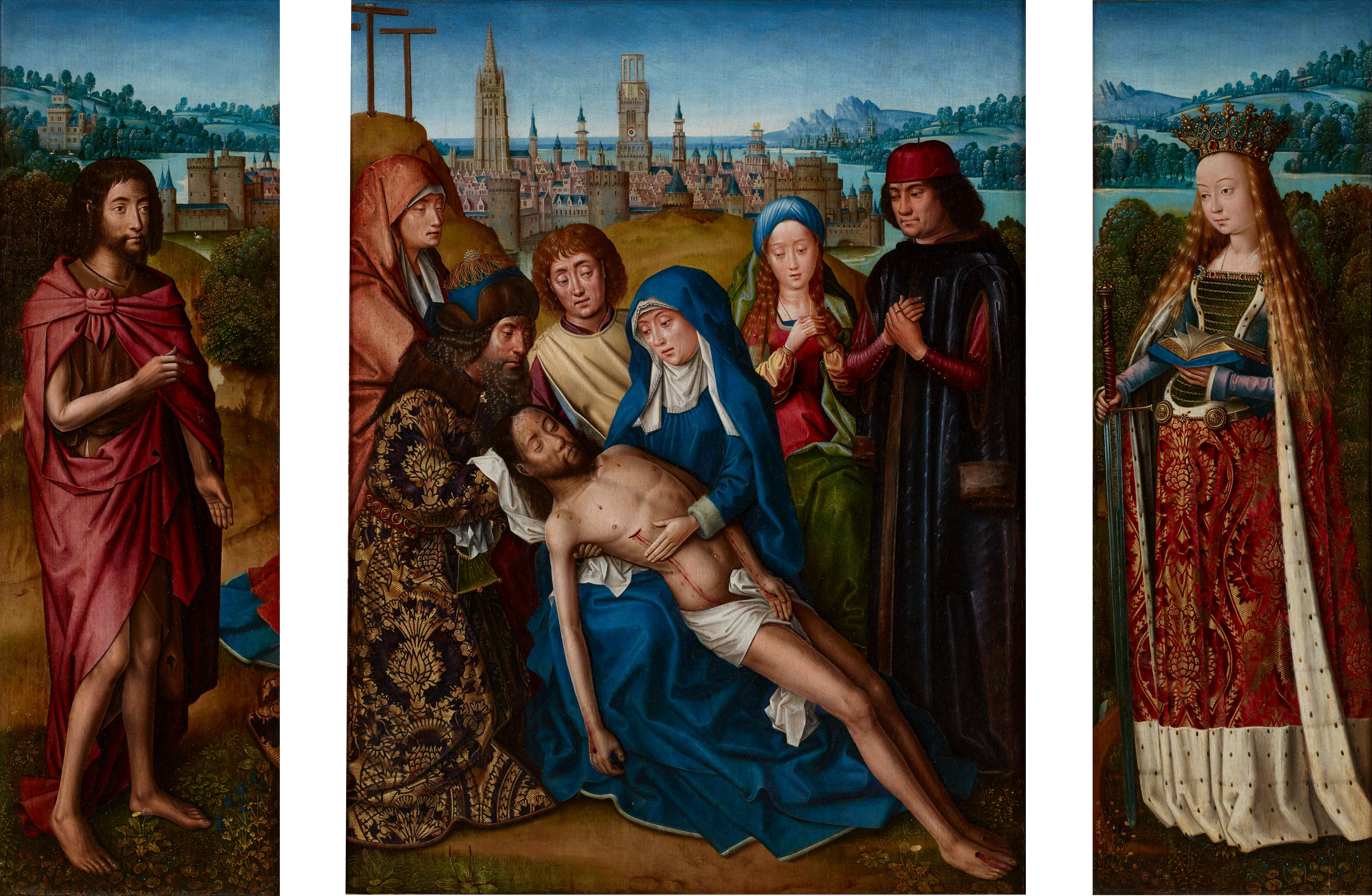
Lamentation with Saint John the Baptist and Saint Catherine of Alexandria (1493–1501), a triptych attributed to the master

== Bibliography ==
- D. de Vos, "Nieuwe toeschrijvingen aan de Meester van de Lucialegende, alias de Meester van de Rotterdamse Johannes op Patmos", Oud Holland, XC, 1976, p. 137-161.
- Max Jakob Friedländer, Early Netherlandish Painting, VI, Hans Memling and Gerard David, New York, 1972.
- D. Martens, "Der Brügger Meister der Lucialegende. Bilanz der Forschungen und neue Hypothesen", Die Kunstbeziehungen Estlands mit den Niederlanden in den 15.-17. Jahrhunderten. Der Marienaltar des Meisters der Lucialegende 500 Jahre in Tallinn, Konferenz 25–26 September 1995, Tallinn, 2000, p. 59-83.
- A. M. Roberts, The Master of the Legend of Saint Lucy: a catalogue and critical essay [Dissertation], University of Pennsylvania, 1982.
- N. Veronee-Verhaegen, "Le Maître de la Légende de sainte Lucie: précisions sur son œuvre", in Bulletin de l'Institut royal du Patrimoine artistique, II, 1959, p. 73-82.
- S. Zdanov, "Quelle identité pour le Maître de la Légende de sainte Lucie? Révision des hypothèses et proposition d'identification", in Koregos. Revue et encyclopédie multimédia des arts sous l'égide de l'Académie royale de Belgique, 2013, 76.
- Mänd, Anu. The Altarpiece of the Virgin Mary and the Confraternity of the Black Heads. - Acta Historiae Artium Balticae, 2 (2007) pp. 35-53
