= Assumption (Guercino) =

Painting by Guercino

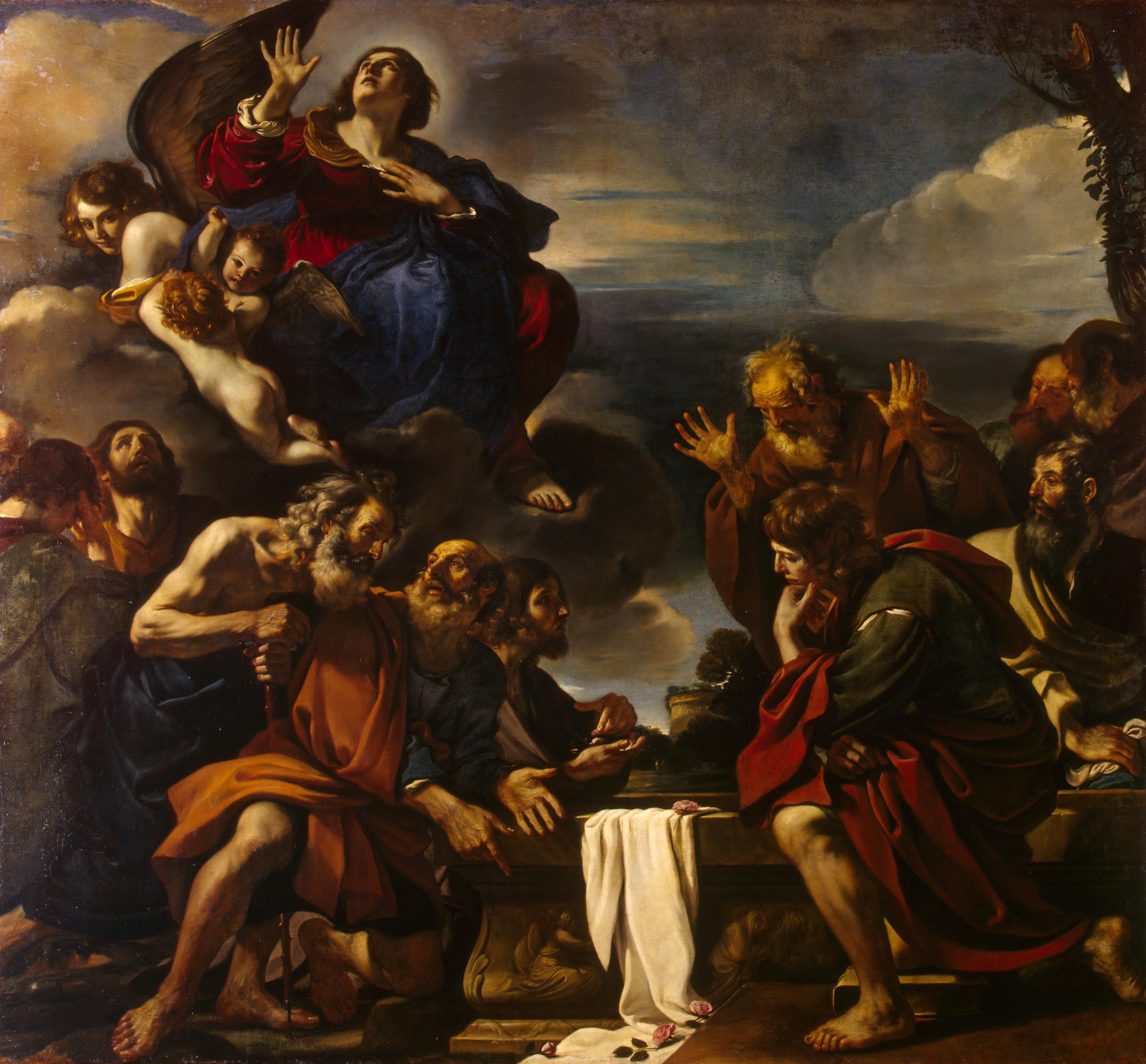
Assumption (c. 1623) by Guercino

Assumption is a c. 1623 oil-on-canvas painting of the Assumption of Mary by the Italian artist Guercino, now in the Hermitage Museum in Saint Petersburg.

== History ==
Its style is similar to that of the same artist's The Burial of St. Petronilla, the apostles are similarly shown to those in Guido Reni's 1617 Assumption (church of Sant'Ambrogio in Genoa) and one of the figures is identical to Guercino's Saint Matthew (Dresden). An early copy of the figure of John the Evangelist (in the foreground in a red cloak) survives in the Doria Pamphilj Gallery in Rome and for a time was considered as an oil sketch for the work by Guercino himself, whilst another early copy of that figure was auctioned on 25 October 1985 at Christie's in London.

Commissioned by Count Alessandro Tanari, it remained in his family for over 200 years. In 1841 it was acquired for the Hermitage by order of Tsar Nicholas I via Pavel Krivtsov, first secretary to the Russian Imperial embassy in Rome, with Gaetano Giordani regretting that Italy had thus lost "such a significant work by the famous artist". It arrived in Saint Petersburg the following year, although an 1840 copy made before it left is now in the Pinacoteca at the Vatican.
