= Assumption Altarpiece =

c. 1530 painting by Moretto da Brescia

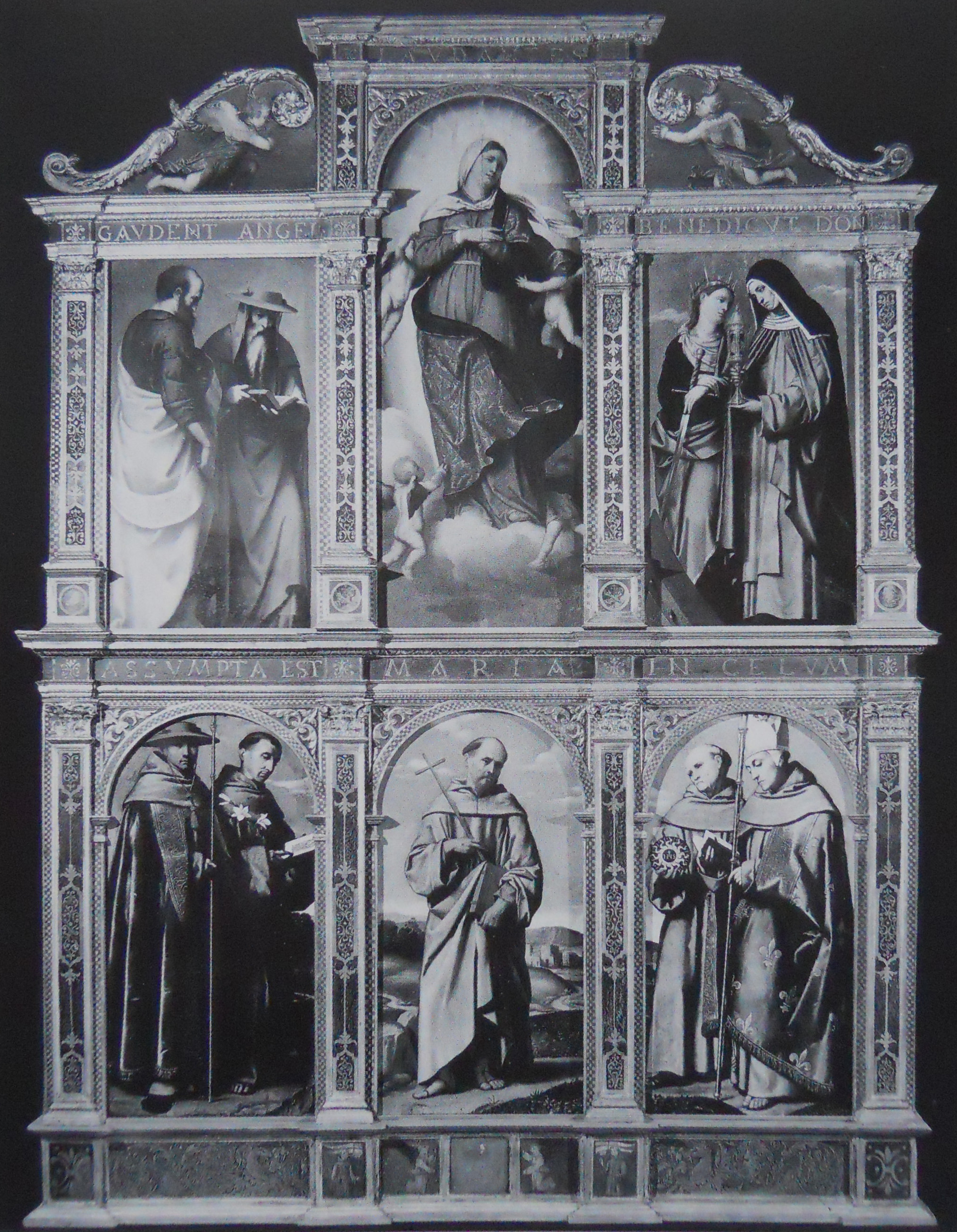
Reconstruction

The Assumption Altarpiece was a 1529-1530 multi-panel painting by Moretto da Brescia. It is mainly oil on panel, although the two angels on the cornice are in tempera grassa verniciata.

The whole work was originally in the Basilica of Santa Maria degli Angeli in Gardone Val Trompia but was split up in 1805 and moved to the Pinacoteca di Brera in Milan. All the panels remained there until 1812, when the two lower side panels (St Bonaventure and St Anthony of Padua and St Bernardino of Siena and St Louis of Toulouse) and three other paintings (one each by Boltraffio, Marco d'Oggiono and Carpaccio) were given to the Louvre in exchange for two paintings by Van Dyck and one each by Rubens, Jordaens and Rembrandt.

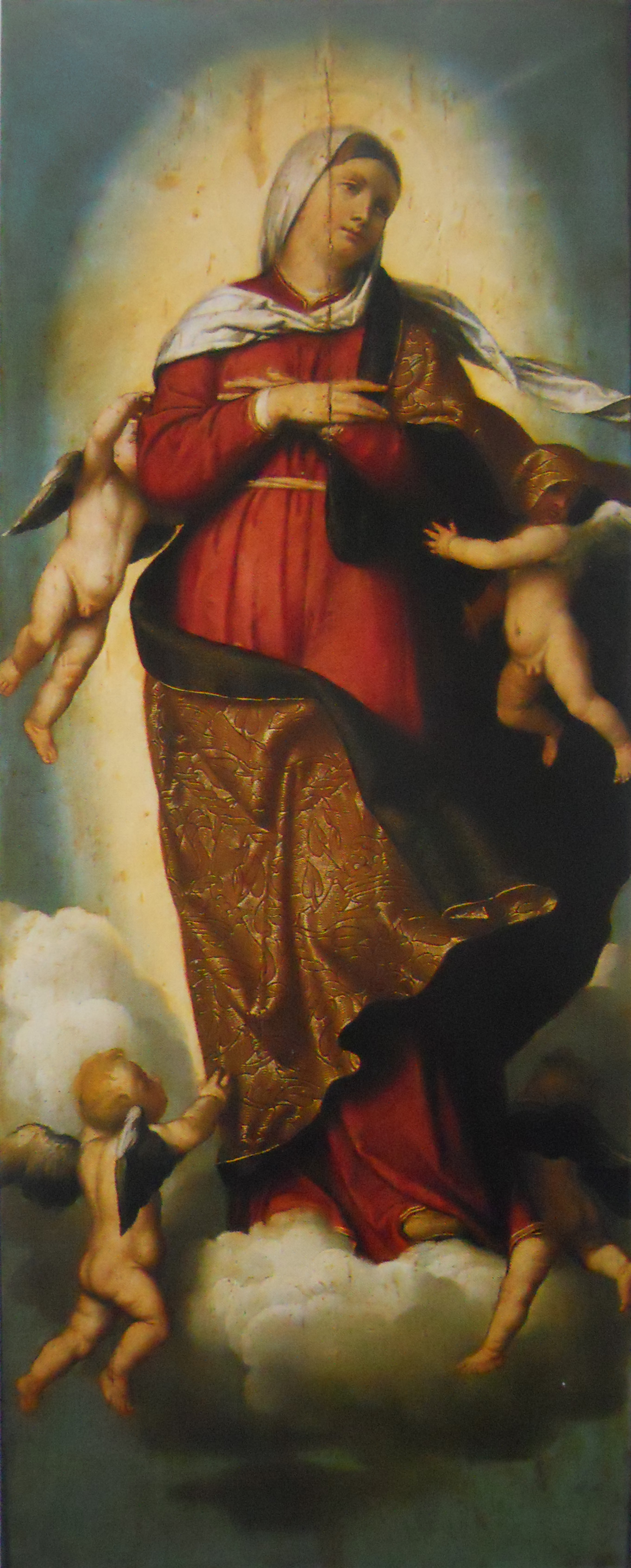
Mary

== Panels ==
=== Cornice ===
- Two Angels

=== Upper register ===
- Saint Jerome and St Paul
- Assumption of the Virgin
- St Catherine of Alexandria and St Clare of Assisi

=== Lower register ===
- St Bonaventure and St Anthony of Padua
- St Francis of Assisi
- St Bernardino of Siena and St Louis of Toulouse
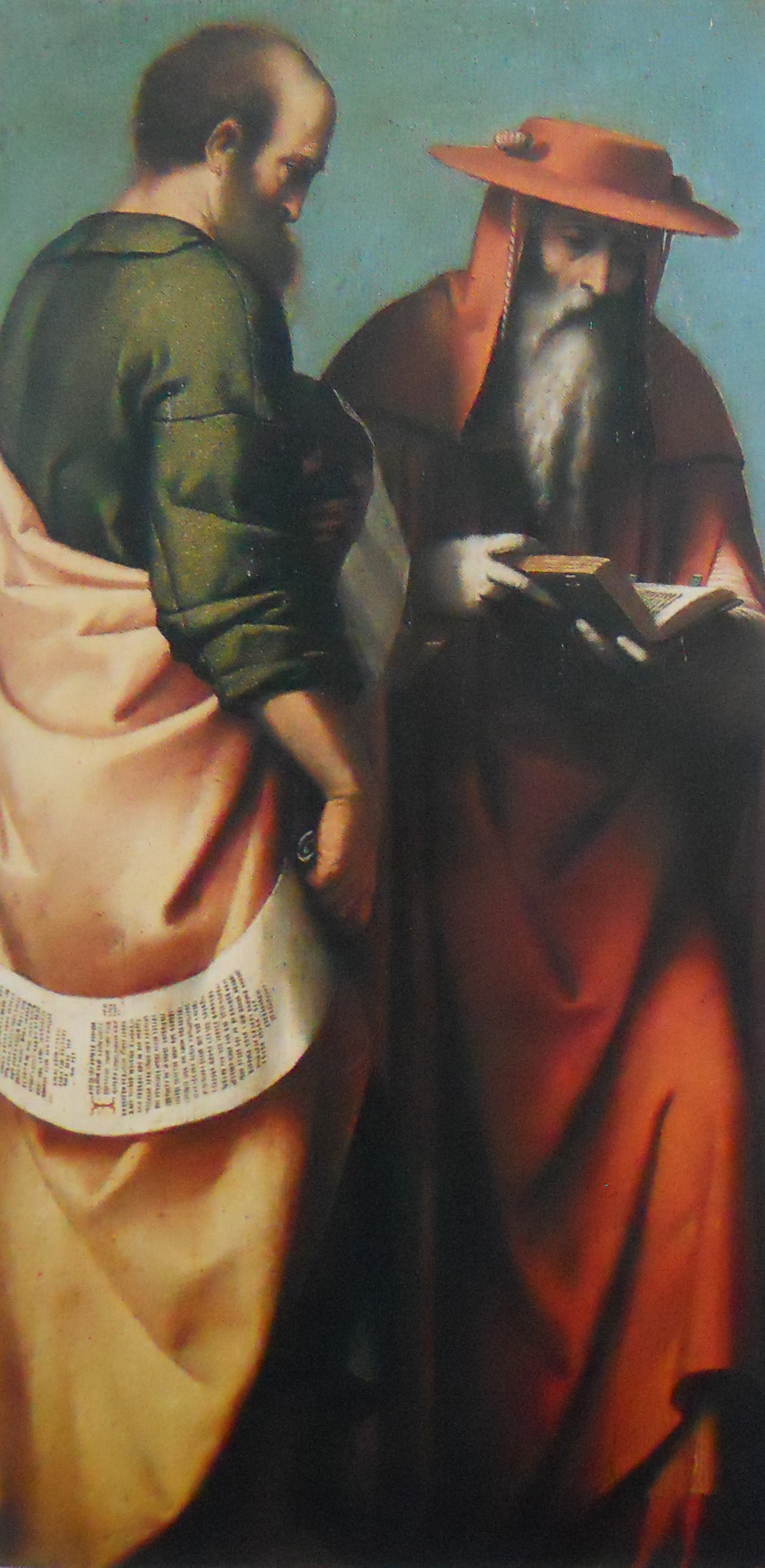
St Jerome and St Paul

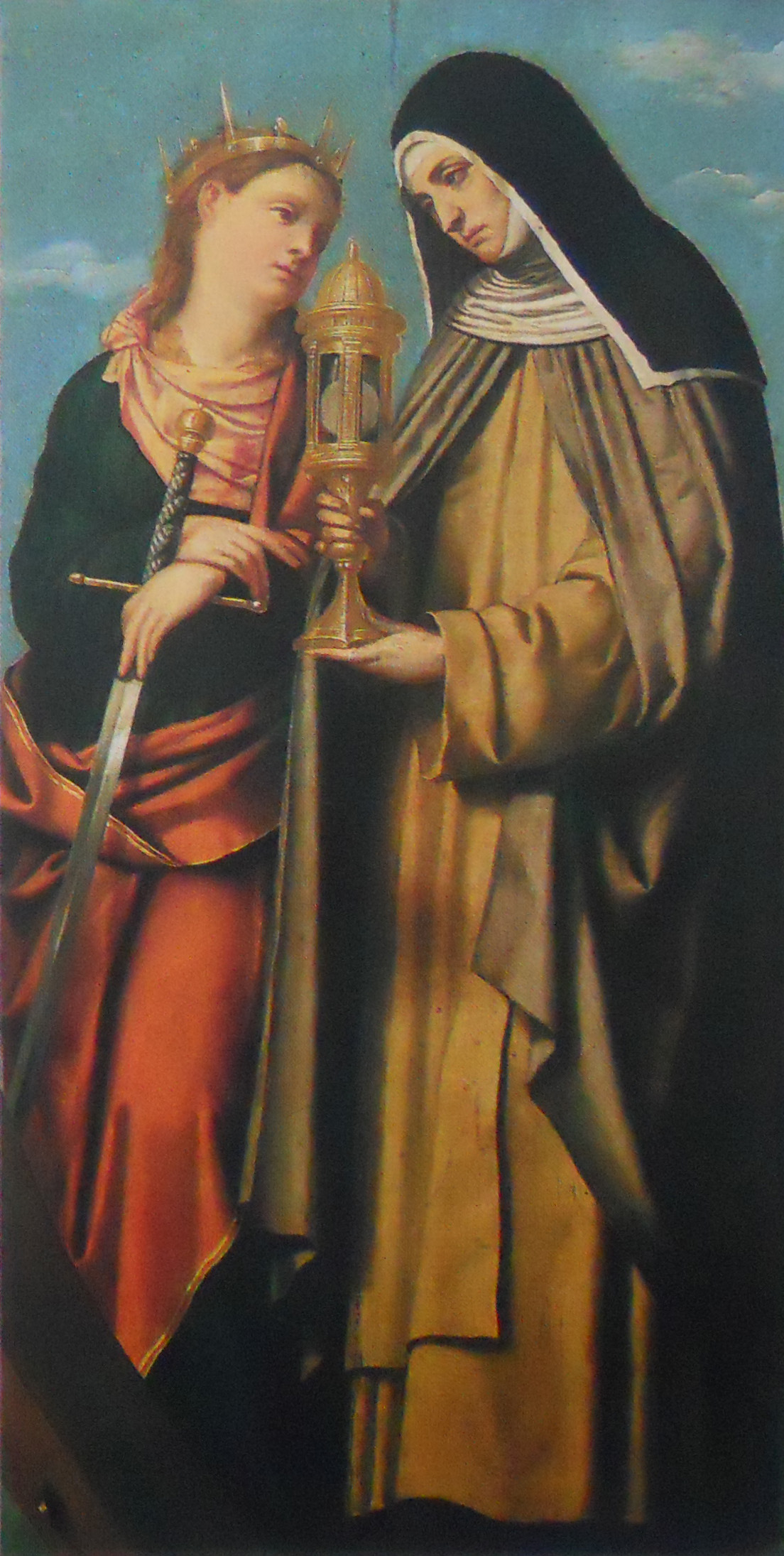
St Catherine of Alexandria and St Clare of Assisi

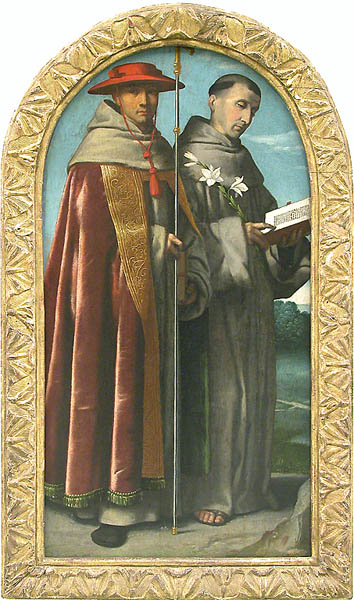
St Bonaventure and St Anthony of Padua (Louvre)

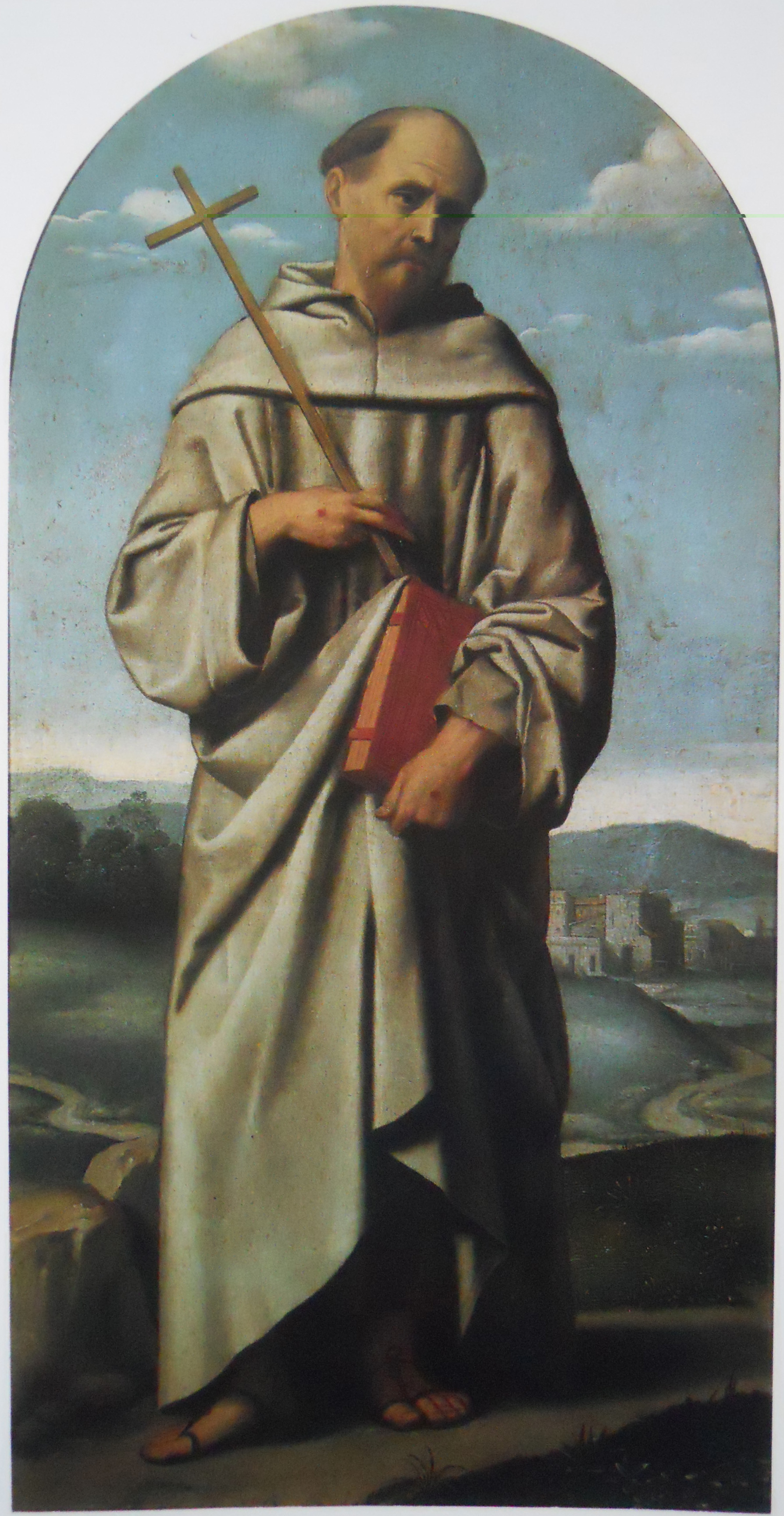
St Francis of Assisi

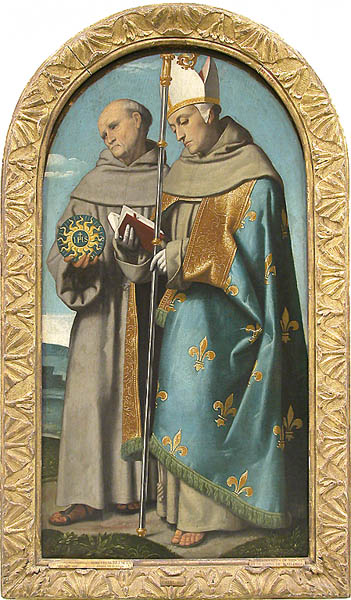
St Bernardino of Siena and St Louis of Toulouse (Louvre)

== Bibliography (in Italian) ==
- Camillo Boselli, Il Moretto, 1498-1554, in "Commentari dell'Ateneo di Brescia per l'anno 1954 - Supplemento", Brescia 1954
- Pietro Da Ponte, L'opera del Moretto, Brescia 1898
- Luigi Falsina, Gemme artistiche triumpline, in "La valle Trompia", anno 7, Brescia 1930
- György Gombosi, Moretto da Brescia, Basel 1943
- Valerio Guazzoni, Moretto. Il tema sacro, Brescia 1981
- Pier Virgilio Begni Redona, Alessandro Bonvicino - Il Moretto da Brescia, Editrice La Scuola, Brescia 1988
- Adolfo Venturi, Storia dell'arte italiana, volume IX, La pittura del Cinquecento, Milano 1929
