= Assumption of the Virgin (Reni, Lyon) =

Painting by Guido Reni

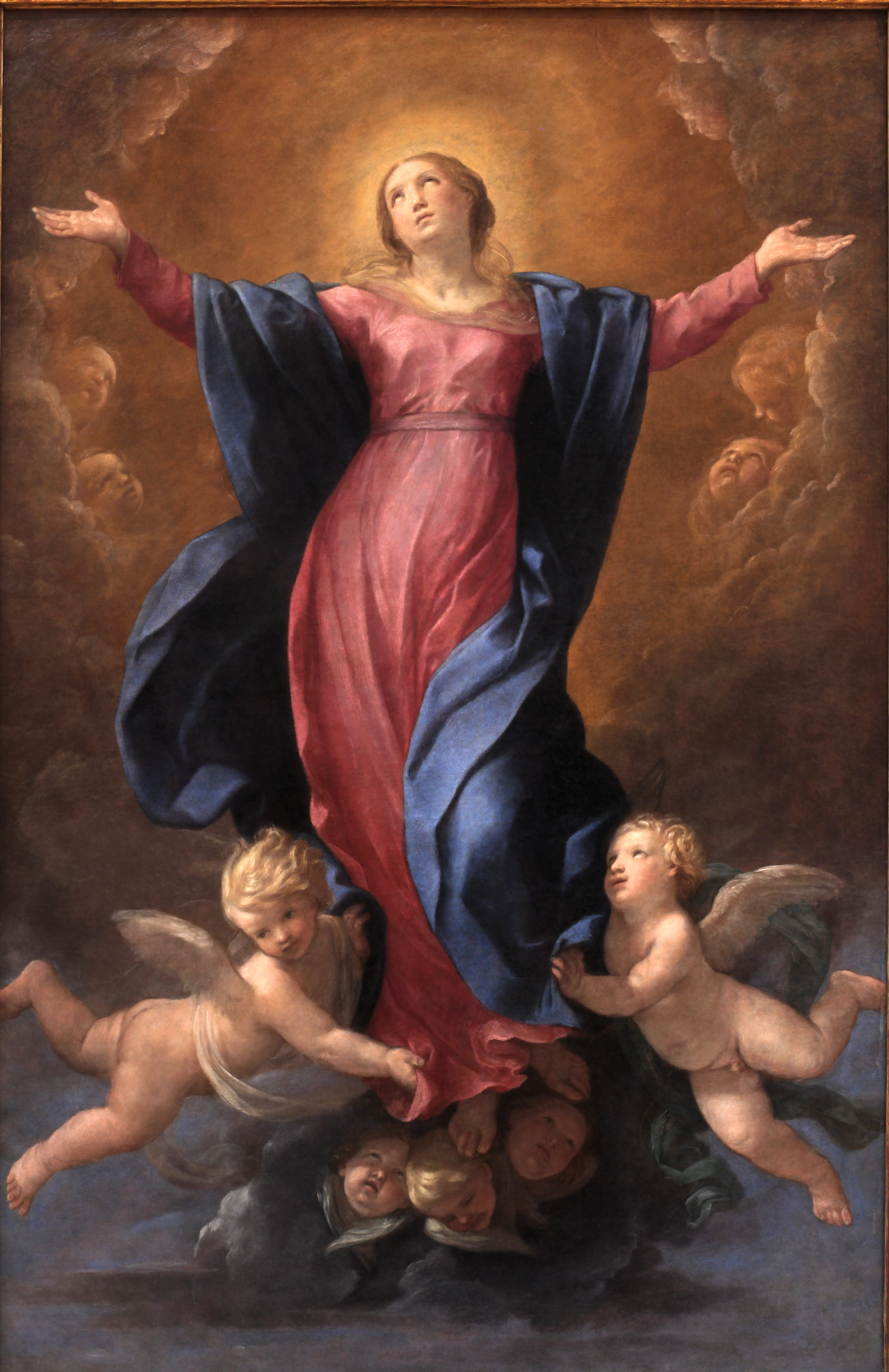
Assumption of the Virgin (1637) by Guido Reni

Assumption of the Virgin is a 1637 oil on canvas painting by Guido Reni, now in the musée des Beaux-Arts de Lyon, which acquired it in 1805. It originally had a semi-circular panel above it showing God the Father—this is now in Bologna.

The Assumption was a recurring theme in Reni's work. This work was commissioned by Luigi Capponi, archbishop of Ravenna, to decorate one of the chapel altars in the Philippine church in Perugia. It was purchased for 400 piastres.
