= Assumption of the Virgin (Rubens, Vienna) =

c. 1637 painting by Peter Paul Rubens

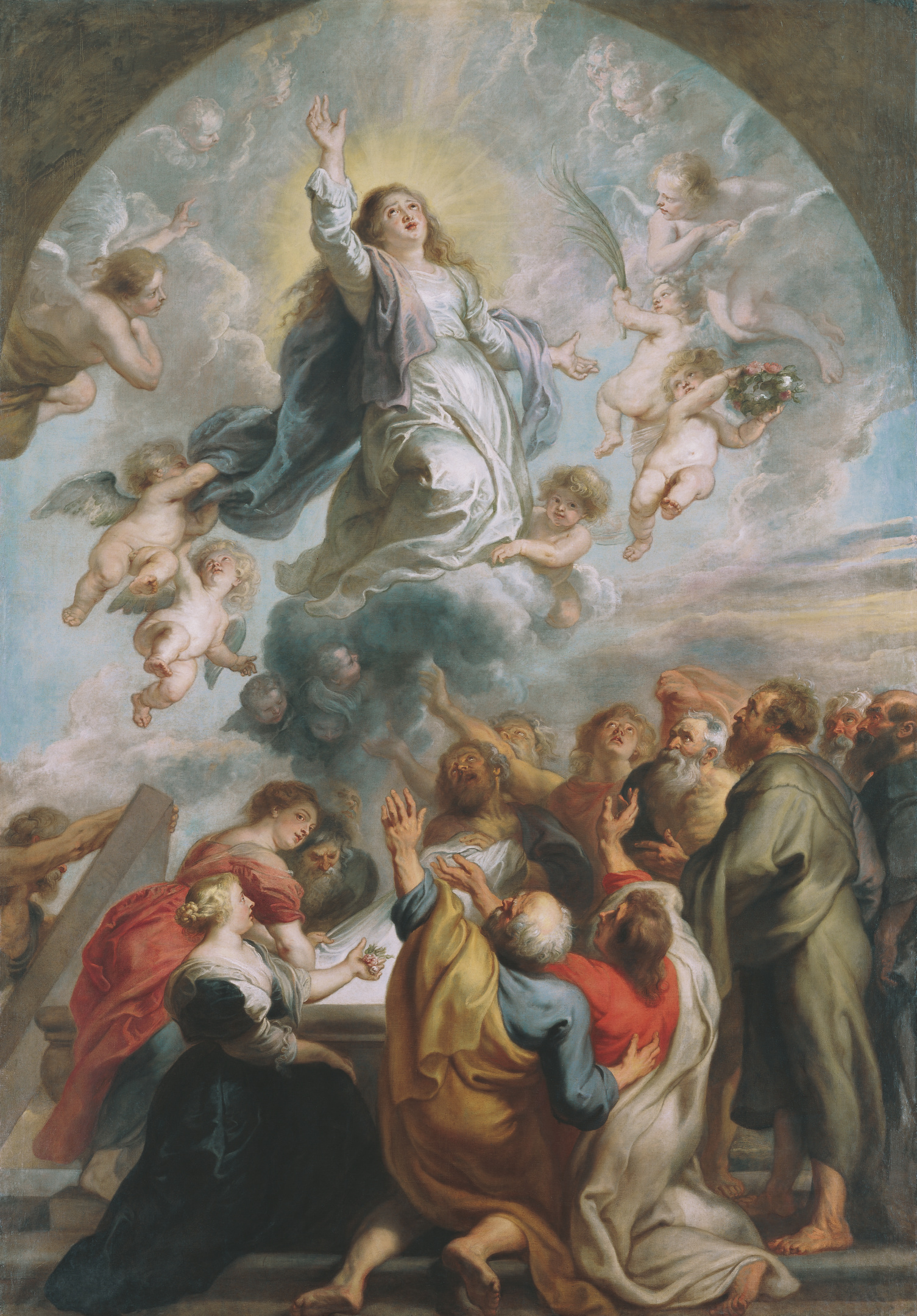

Assumption of the Virgin Mary is a c. 1637 oil on canvas painting by Peter Paul Rubens. It was commissioned for the high altar of the Carthusian Church in Brussels by Charles and Johannes Angelus de Schotte between 1629 and 1639. Two oil sketches for it are now in the Courtauld Institute and Yale University Art Gallery.

Prince Karl Eusebius von Liechtenstein acquired it in 1643 and it was placed on an altar in the parish church at Valtice from 1671. The princely family moved it to their gallery in the City Palace in Bankgasse, Vienna in 1764 and it also hung in the gallery of their Garden Palace at Roßau from 1815 to 1945.
