= Assumption of the Virgin (Reni, Munich) =

Painting by Guido Reni

The Assumption of Virgin Mary
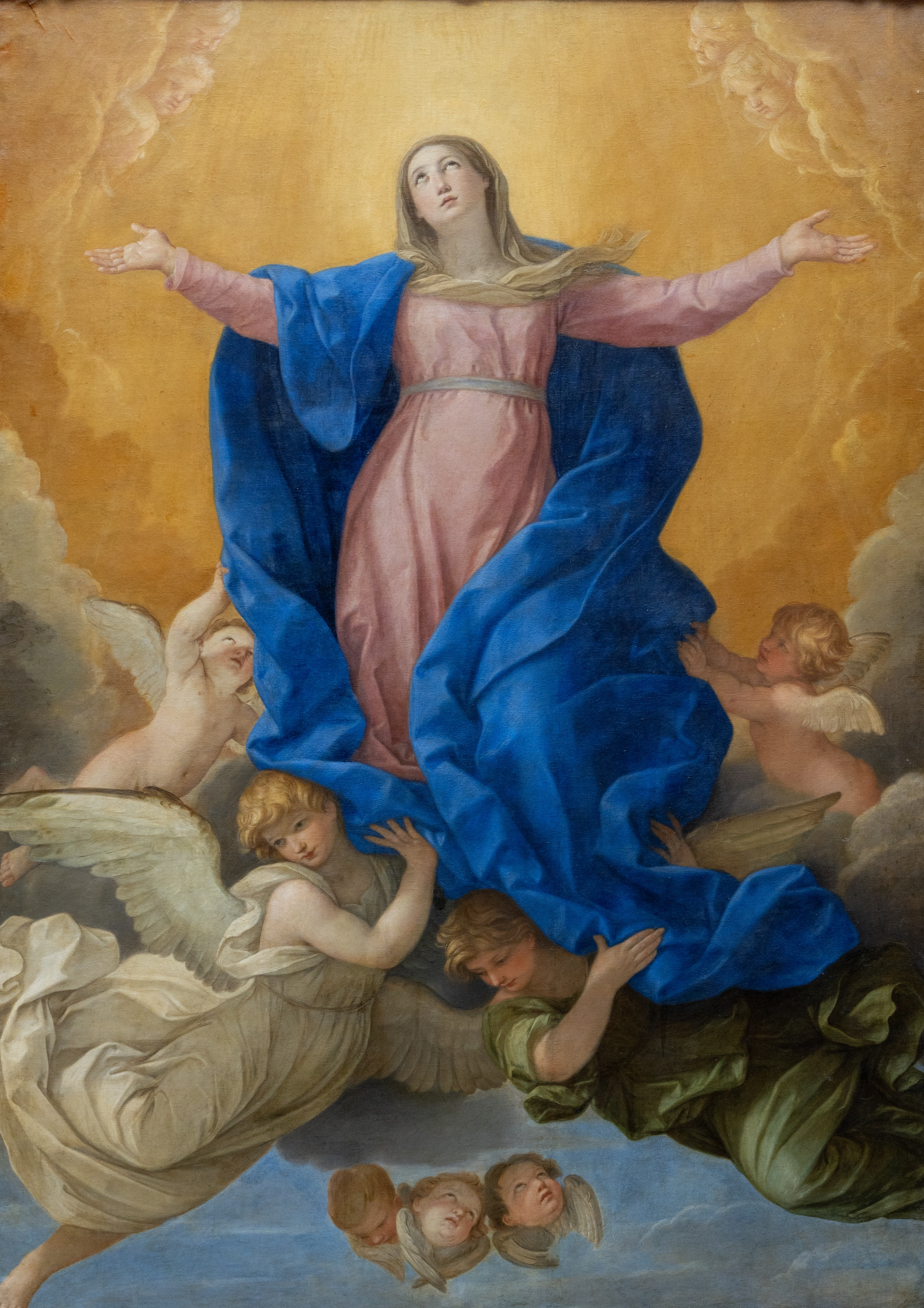
- Artist: Guido Reni
- Year: c. 1630s
- Medium: silk
- Dimensions: 295 cm (116 in) × 208 cm (82 in)
- Location: Alte Pinakothek, upper floor, gallery X, Modena, Electoral Gallery Dusseldorf
- Collection: Bavarian State Painting Collections
- Accession No.: 446
- Identifiers: Bildindex der Kunst und Architektur ID: 00056030

Assumption of the Virgin is a c. 1638-1639 oil on canvas painting by Guido Reni. It entered its present home at the Alte Pinakothek from the Galerie Düsseldorf in 1806.
