= Redemptoris custos =

Apostolic exhortation by Pope John Paul II

Redemptoris custos Latin for 'Guardian of the Redeemer' Apostolic exhortation of Pope John Paul II
- Signature date: 15 August 1989
- Number: 6 of 15 of the pontificate
- Text: In Latin; In English

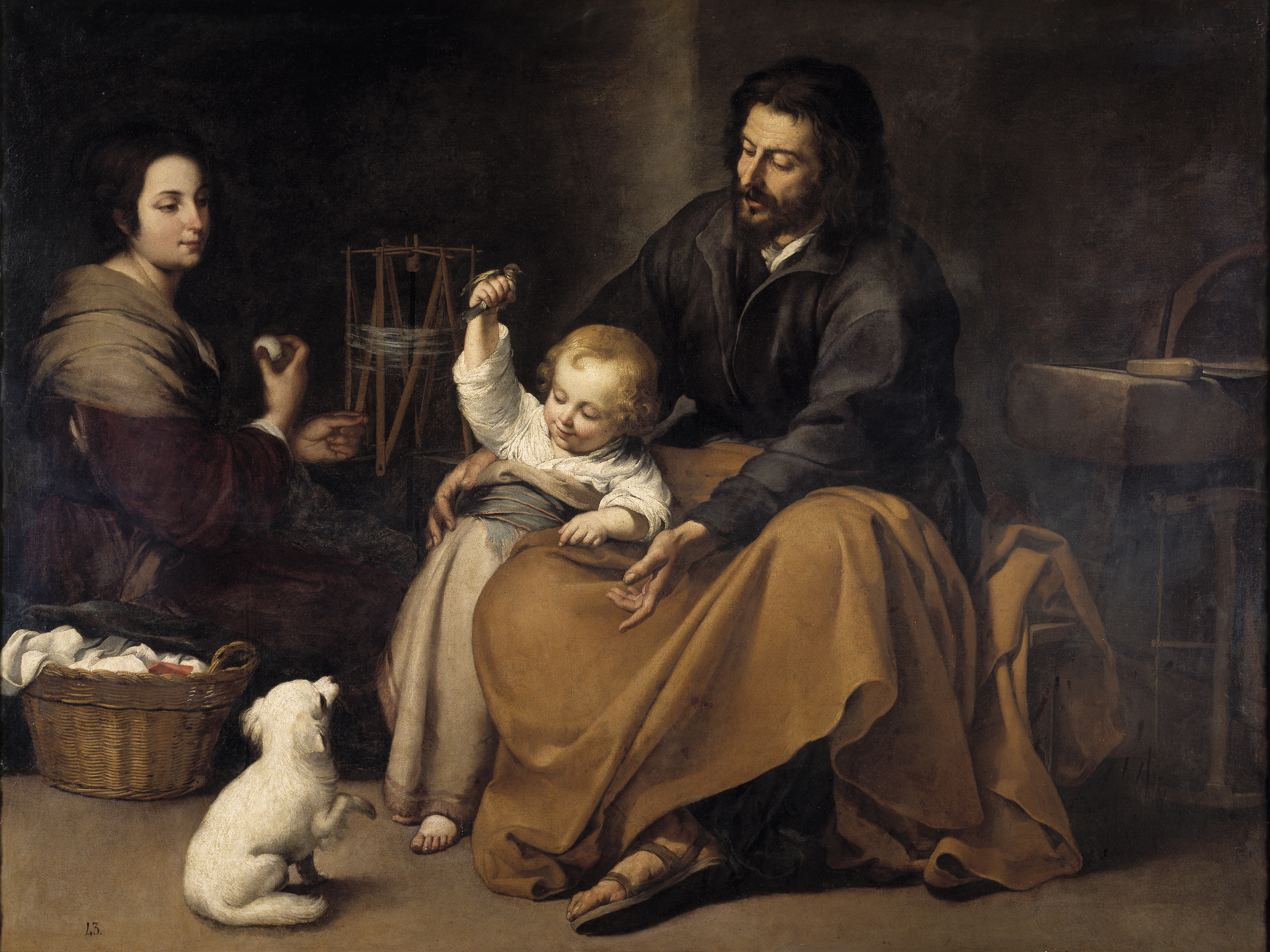
The Holy Family with a Little Bird, by Bartolomé Esteban Murillo, c. 1650

Redemptoris Custos (Guardian of the Redeemer) is the title of an apostolic exhortation by Pope John Paul II on Saint Joseph. It was delivered on August 15, 1989 in Saint Peter's Basilica in Rome on the occasion of the centenary of Pope Leo XIII's encyclical Quamquam pluries.

It discusses the importance of Saint Joseph in the Holy Family, and presents the pope's view of Saint Joseph's role in the plan of redemption. John Paul II positions Saint Joseph as breaking the old vice of paternal familial domination, and suggests him as the model of a loving father.

Noted Josephologist, Father Tarcisio Stramare, of the Oblates of Saint Joseph, was a main collaborator in the preparation of Redemptoris Custos. This exhortation is part of the "redemption documents" issued by Pope John Paul II, and refers to the Marian encyclical Redemptoris Mater.

== Content ==
In this document, John Paul II reemphasized key elements of Quamquam Pluries regarding the position of St. Joseph in the Church and his connection to Mary, which he had already acknowledged in his encyclical Redemptoris Mater. He wrote:

"Together with Mary, Joseph is the first guardian of this divine mystery. Together with Mary, and in relation to Mary, he shares in this final phase of God's self-revelation in Christ and he does so from the very beginning." "The Gospels clearly describe the fatherly responsibility of Joseph toward Jesus. For salvation-which comes through the humanity of Jesus-is realized in actions which are an everyday part of family life... All of the so-called "private" or "hidden" life of Jesus is entrusted to Joseph's guardianship. "

Pope John Paul II pointed out that as legal guardian of the child Jesus, Joseph fulfilled all the obligations that entailed: in having his son circumcised according to the law, in conferring a name upon him, and in presenting him in the Temple at the prescribed time.

The growth of Jesus "in wisdom and in stature, and in favor with God and man" (Lk 2:52) took place within the Holy Family under the eyes of Joseph, who had the important task of "raising" Jesus, that is, feeding, clothing and educating him in the Law and in a trade, in keeping with the duties of a father. ...For his part, Jesus "was obedient to them" (Lk 2:51), respectfully returning the affection of his 'parents'. In this way he wished to sanctify the obligations of the family and of work, which he performed at the side of Joseph.

The Church venerates the Holy Family, and proposes it as the model of all families. "In this family, Joseph is the father: his fatherhood is not one that derives from begetting offspring; but neither is it an "apparent" or merely "substitute" fatherhood. Rather, it is one that fully shares in authentic human fatherhood and the mission of a father in the family.

"What is crucially important here is the sanctification of daily life, a sanctification which each person must acquire according to his or her own state, and one which can be promoted according to a model accessible to all people." John Paul II then quoted his predecessor, Pope Paul VI. "St. Joseph is the model of those humble ones that Christianity raises up to great destinies;...he is the proof that in order to be a good and genuine follower of Christ, there is no need of great things-it is enough to have the common, simple and human virtues, but they need to be true and authentic."

Recalling Quamquam pluries, Pope John Paul II again stressed that the Church has implored the protection of Saint Joseph on the basis of "that sacred bond of charity which united him to the Immaculate Virgin Mother of God," and that the Church has commended to Joseph all of her cares, including those dangers which threaten the human family. "Besides trusting in Joseph's sure protection, the Church also trusts in his noble example, which transcends all individual states of life and serves as a model for the entire Christian community, whatever the condition and duties of each of its members may be."

== See also ==
- Josephology
- Quamquam Pluries
- Redemptoris Mater
