= Tarcisio Stramare =

Italian Catholic priest and scholar (1928–2020)

Personal life
- Born: 14 September 1928 Valdobbiadene, Italy
- Died: 20 March 2020 (aged 91) Imperia, Italy

Religious life
- Religion: Roman Catholicism
- Ordination: 1952

Military service
- Rank: Priest

Tarcisio Stramare (14 September 1928 – 20 March 2020) was an Italian Catholic priest, biblical scholar, writer and teacher. He was considered one of the greatest international scholars of Josephology.

== Biography ==
Stramare was born on 14 September 1928 in Valdobbiadene. He studied in Rome and Jerusalem and became a member of the Congregation of the Oblates of St. Joseph, being ordained a priest in 1952. A learned scholar, already in the 1970s he was called to occupy the chair of Sacred Scripture at the Pontifical Lateran University and, subsequently, at the Pontifical Urban University and at the Pontifical theological faculty "Marianum". He received some important assignments from the Holy See, both in the Pontifical Commission for the Nova Vulgata (since 1973) of which he was responsible for the editions of the text until his death as the Consultor of the Holy Congregation for the Causes of Saints.

The testimony and reflections of Stramare have had, especially since the late 1990s, considerable media relevance, both through radio and television networks, national and international. Stramare himself appeared repeatedly in broad audience programs, some of which were broadcast by RAI.

He died on 20 March 2020, in Imperia, at the age of 91, of COVID-19.

== Josephology ==
Stramare has always had a deep interest in Saint Joseph, making known the centrality of the figure and the role played in the divine mystery of Salvation. Taking into consideration the inseparable link existing between Incarnation and Redemption, Saint Joseph is highlighted thanks to the role played by Jesus' putative Father, as a true minister of Salvation. These approaches are at the basis of the theological line followed by John Paul II in the apostolic exhortation Redemptoris Custos (1989).

For Stramare, the figure of Saint Joseph, in the mystery of Salvation, therefore has, among the Saints, an importance second only to that of the Virgin Mary.

== Works ==
- St. Joseph in Sacred Scripture, in theology and in worship, Milan, Piemme, 1983.
- Matthew for divorce? Study on Matthew 5, 32 and 19, 9, Brescia, Paideia, 1986.
- St. Joseph in the mystery of God, Milan, Piemme, 1992.
- The Holy Family in the Mystery of the Incarnation, Naples, EDI, 1994.
- Jesus called him Father. Historical-doctrinal review on San Giuseppe, Rome, Vatican Publishing House, 1997.
- Gospel of the Mysteries of the Hidden Life of Jesus (Matthew and Luke I-II), Bornato in Franciacorta, Ed. Sardini, 1998.
- The Theology of Divine Revelation (IV edition), Casale Monferrato, Ed. Portalupi, 2000.
- Joseph called him Jesus, Casale Monferrato, Portalupi Editore, 2001.
- The marriage of the Mother of God, Verona, Ed. Stimmatine, 2001.
- Way of the cross. Following in the footsteps of the Redeemer, Rome, Vatican Publishing House, 2004.
- St. Joseph "The keeper of the Redeemer" and the identity of the Church, Cinisello Balsamo, Edizioni San Paolo, 2005.
- Scrutinize the Scriptures, Essays on exegesis and biblical theology, Bornato in Franciacorta, Ed. Sardini, 2006.
- St. Joseph, the saint closest to Jesus, Turin, Elledici Editrice, 2008.
- St. Joseph. Dignity, privileges, devotions, Camerata Piceno, Shalom, 2008.
- St. Joseph in the Holy Fathers, in ecclesiastical writers and theologians up to San Bernardo, Naples, Italian Dominican Publishing House, 2009.

== See also ==
- Pontifical Urbaniana University
