= Josephology =

Theological study of Saint Joseph

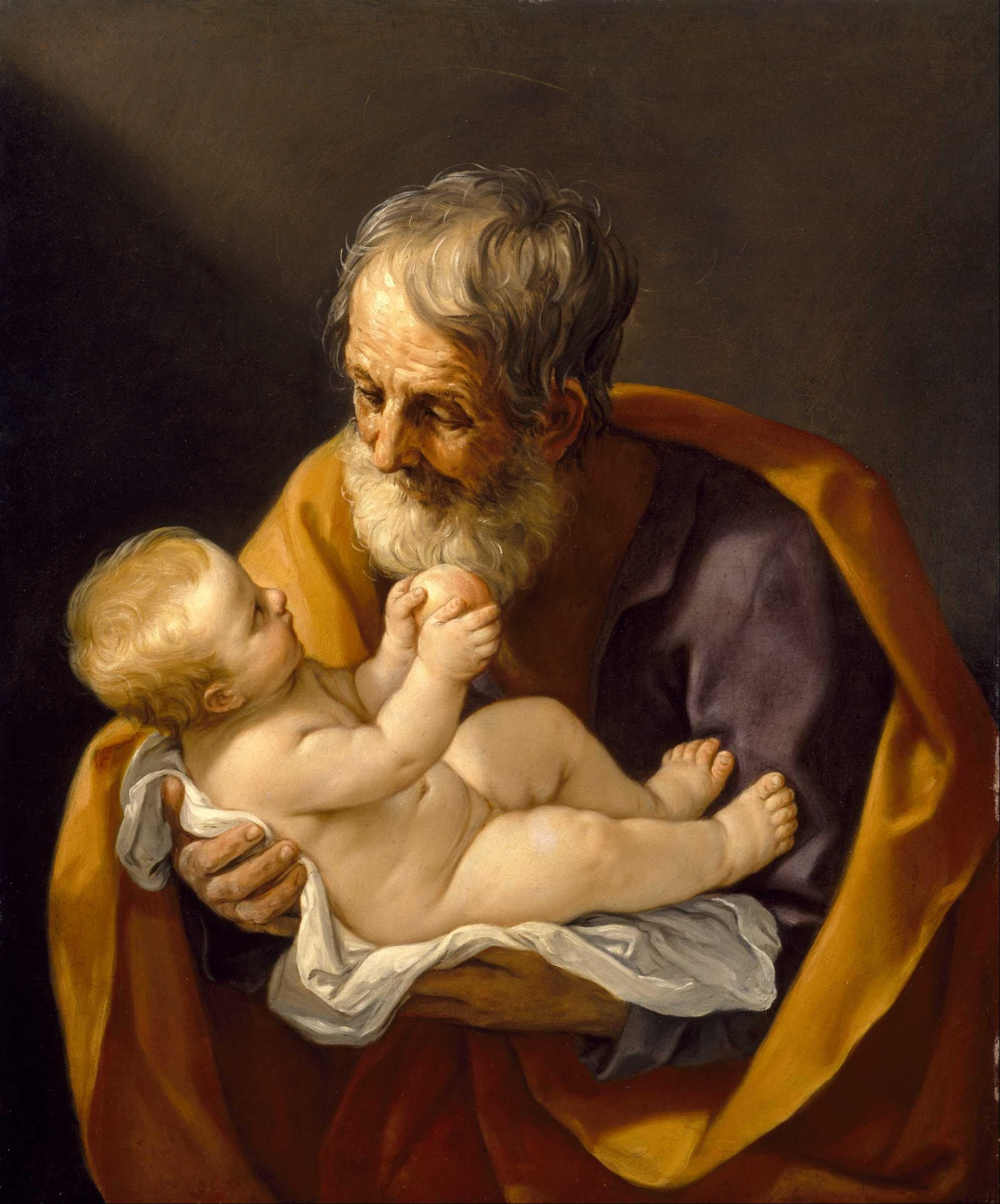
Saint Joseph and the Christ Child by Guido Reni, c. 1640

Josephology is the theological study of Joseph, the husband of Mary, mother of Jesus. Records of devotions to Joseph go back to the year 800 and Doctors of the Church since Thomas Aquinas have written on the subject. With the growth of Mariology, the theological study of Joseph also grew and in the 1950s specific centers for it were formed. The modern study of the theology concerning Joseph is one of the newest theological disciplines.

== History and background ==
=== Early period ===
Jerome's Against Helvidius (c. 383) paved the way for aspects of future Josephite devotion with his assertion that Joseph was always a virgin. The earliest record of a formal devotional following for Joseph in the Western Church is in the abridged Martyrology of Rheinau in Northern France, which dates to the year 800. References to Joseph as nutritor Domini ("educator/guardian of the Lord") from the 9th to the 14th centuries continued to increase as Mariology developed, and by the 12th century, along with greater devotion to Mary, the writings of the Benedictine monks began to foster a following for Joseph and they inserted his name in their liturgical calendars and their martyrology.

In the 13th century, the Dominican Doctor of the Church Thomas Aquinas discussed the necessity of the presence of Joseph in the plan of the Incarnation for if Mary had not been married, her fellow Jews would have stoned her to death and that a young Jesus needed the care and protection of a human father. The Josephology of Aquinas often proceeded with the juxtaposition of Joseph and Mary.

In the 15th century, major steps were taken by Bernardine of Siena, Pierre d'Ailly, and Jean Gerson, the chancellor of the Cathedral of Notre Dame, Paris. Gerson wrote a lengthy treatise in French titled Consideration sur Saint Joseph and a 120-verse poem in Latin about Saint Joseph. In 1416 to 1418, Gerson preached sermons on Saint Joseph at the Council of Constance in which he borrowed heavily from Marian themes.

=== 16th–19th centuries ===
The growth of the following of Joseph is manifested with the earliest church dedicated to him in Rome, San Giuseppe dei Falegnami (St. Joseph of the Carpenters), constructed in 1540 in the Forum Romanum, above the prison that by tradition had held the Apostles Peter and Paul. The spread of his following is then shown by the publication of the first Litany of St. Joseph in Rome in 1597 and the introduction of the Cord of St. Joseph in Antwerp in 1657. These were then followed by the Chaplet of St. Joseph in 1850, and the Scapular of St. Joseph of the Capuchins which was approved in 1880. The formal veneration of the Holy Family began in the 17th century by Mgr François de Laval.

From the 16th century onwards, a number of Catholic saints prayed to Saint Joseph, invoked his help and protection and encouraged others to do so. In Introduction to the Devout Life Francis de Sales included Joseph along with the Virgin Mary as saints to be invoked during prayers following an examination of conscience. Teresa of Avila attributed her recovery of health to Joseph and recommended him as an advocate. In her biography The Story of a Soul, Thérèse of Lisieux stated that for a period of time, she prayed every day to "Saint Joseph, Father and Protector of Virgins..." and felt safe from danger as a result. The three mentioned in this paragraph are all Doctors of the Church.

In 1870, Pope Pius IX proclaimed Saint Joseph "Patron of the Universal Church". In 1889, Pope Leo XIII issued the encyclical Quamquam pluries in which he urged Catholics to pray to Joseph as patron of the church. This was in view of challenges facing the church, such as the growing depravity of morals in the young generation. He prescribed that every October, a prayer to Saint Joseph be added to the Rosary, with attached indulgences.

== Modern development ==
With the growth of Mariology, the theological study of Joseph also began to grow to discuss his role in the Economy of Salvation. Three centers for Josephology were formed in the 1950s, the first in Valladolid, Spain, the second at Saint Joseph's Oratory in Montreal, and the third in the theologate of Viterbo, Italy.

During the centenary of Quamquam pluries in 1989, Pope John Paul II delivered the Apostolic exhortation Redemptoris custos ("Guardian of the Redeemer"). This exhortation is part of the "redemption documents" issued by the pope, and refers to the Marian encyclical Redemptoris Mater. It discusses the importance of Saint Joseph in the Holy Family, and presents the pope's view of Saint Joseph's role in the plan of redemption. John Paul II positions Saint Joseph as breaking the old vice of paternal familial domination, and suggests him as the model of a loving father.

== See also ==
- Mariology
- Catholic Mariology
- List of churches named after Saint Joseph
  - Saint Joseph's Oratory, largest church in Canada
- List of places named after Saint Joseph
