= List of places named after Saint Joseph =

The following is a list of places named after Saint Joseph.

== Brazil ==
Original Name	Type	State
Baía de São José	Bay	Maranhão
Jardim São José, Campinas	Neighbourhood	São Paulo
São José	Municipality	(Santa Catarina (state)) Santa Catarina
São José, Paulínia	Neighbourhood	São Paulo
São José da Barra	Municipality	Minas Gerais
São José da Coroa Grande	Municipality	Pernambuco
São José do Barreiro	Municipality	(São Paulo (state)) São Paulo
São José do Calçado	Municipality	Espírito Santo
São José do Campestre	Municipality	Rio Grande do Norte
São José do Cedro	Municipality	(Santa Catarina (state)) Santa Catarina
São José do Cerrito	Municipality	(Santa Catarina (state)) Santa Catarina
São José do Rio Preto	Municipality	(São Paulo (state)) São Paulo
São José dos Ausentes	Municipality	Rio Grande do Sul
São José dos Campos	Municipality	(São Paulo (state)) São Paulo
São José dos Dourados River	River	(São Paulo (state)) São Paulo
São José dos Pinhais	Municipality	(Paraná (state)) Paraná
São José dos Quatro Marcos	Municipality	Mato Grosso
São José do Vale do Rio Preto	Municipality	(Rio de Janeiro (state)) Rio de Janeiro
São José do Xingu	Municipality	Mato Grosso
São José Operário, Manaus	Neighbourhood	(Amazonas (Brazilian state)) Amazonas

== Canada ==
- St. Joseph in Antigonish County, Nova Scotia
- St. Joseph in Digby County, Nova Scotia
- St. Joseph Island, Ontario, Canada
  - St. Joseph Township
  - Fort St. Joseph (Ontario), former British outpost on St. Joseph Island
  - St Joseph Secondary School (Mississauga) in Mississauga, ON
  - St Joseph Elementary School (Brampton) in Brampton, Ontario
- Several places called Saint-Joseph in Quebec
  - Lac-Saint-Joseph, Quebec
  - Saint-Joseph-de-Beauce, Quebec
  - Saint-Joseph-de-Coleraine, Quebec
  - Saint-Joseph-de-Kamouraska, Quebec
  - Saint-Joseph-de-Lepage, Quebec
  - Saint-Joseph-des-Érables, Quebec
  - Saint-Joseph-de-Sorel, Quebec
  - Saint-Joseph-du-Lac, Quebec
- St. Joseph's, Saskatchewan hamlet in south east Saskatchewan
- St. Joseph's Colony, Saskatchewan in west central Saskatchewan
- St. Joseph Island, a Canadian island in Lake Huron

== Caribbean ==
- Saint Joseph (Trinidad and Tobago)
- The Parish of Saint Joseph, Barbados
- Saint Joseph Parish, Dominica
- Île Saint-Joseph, the southernmost island of the three Îles du Salut in the Atlantic Ocean off the coast of French Guiana

== France ==
- Saint-Joseph, Loire
- Saint-Joseph, Manche
- Saint-Joseph, Martinique
- Saint-Joseph, Réunion
- Saint-Joseph-de-Rivière, in the Isère département
- Saint-Joseph-des-Bancs, in the Ardèche département
- Saint-Joseph AOC, an Appellation d'Origine Contrôlée in the Rhône wine region

== India ==
- Sao Jose de Areal, Salcette, Goa

== Mexico ==
- San José Chiapa
- San José de Gracia (disambiguation), several places
- San José Iturbide
- San José Teacalco
- San Jose del Cabo

== Philippines ==
- San Jose, Batangas
- San Jose, Camarines Sur
- San Jose, Dinagat Islands
- San Jose, Negros Oriental
- San Jose, Northern Samar
- San Jose, Nueva Ecija
- San Jose, Occidental Mindoro
- San Jose, Romblon
- San Jose, Tarlac
- San Jose de Buan, Samar
- San Jose de Buenavista, Antique
- San Jose del Monte

== Central America ==
- San José, Costa Rica, capital city of Costa Rica

== Spain ==
- San José (Almeria)

== United States ==
=== Cities ===
- San Jose, California
- St. Joseph, Illinois
- St. Joseph, Kansas
- St. Joseph, Louisiana
- St. Joseph, Michigan
- St. Joseph, Minnesota
- Saint Joseph, Missouri
- Saint Joseph, Oregon
- St. Joseph, Wisconsin

=== Neighborhoods ===
- St. Joseph, in Louisville, Kentucky
- Saint Joseph, in Milwaukee, Wisconsin

=== Counties ===
- St. Joseph County, Indiana
- St. Joseph County, Michigan

=== Townships ===
- St. Joseph Township, Champaign County, Illinois
- St. Joseph Township, Allen County, Indiana
- St. Joseph Charter Township, Michigan
- St. Joseph Township, Kittson County, Minnesota
- St. Joseph Township, Stearns County, Minnesota
- St. Joseph Township, Pembina County, North Dakota in Pembina County, North Dakota
- St. Joseph Township, Williams County, Ohio

=== Water features ===
- St. Joseph Bay, a bay on the Gulf Coast of Florida
- St. Joseph Sound, a bay in Pinellas County, Florida
- St. Joseph River (Lake Michigan) in southwest Michigan and northwest Indiana
- St. Joseph River (Maumee River) in south central Michigan and northeast Indiana

=== Land features ===
- St. Joseph Peninsula, a peninsula or spit on the Gulf Coast of Florida
- St. Joseph Point, the end of the St. Joseph Peninsula in Florida
- San José Island (Texas), a barrier island on the Texas coast in the United States, also known as "St. Joseph Island"
- St. Joseph Valley Parkway, carrying parts of U.S. Routes 20 and 31

== Churches ==
- St. Joseph's Church (disambiguation), numerous

== Hospitals ==
- St. Joseph Medical Center (disambiguation), numerous
