= Quamquam pluries =

1889 encyclical by Pope Leo XIII

Quamquam pluries Encyclical of Pope Leo XIII
- Signature date: 15 August 1889
- Subject: On Devotion to Saint Joseph
- Number: 32 of 85 of the pontificate
- Text: In English

Quamquam pluries is an encyclical on Saint Joseph by Pope Leo XIII. It was issued on August 15, 1889 in Saint Peter's Basilica in Rome.

== Saint Joseph ==
Leo XIII presented Saint Joseph as a model at a time when the world and the Church were wrestling with the challenges posed by modernity. With the encyclical Quamquam pluries, Leo XIII was the first pope to draw the lines of a theology of Saint Joseph, with clearly defined titles that fit into the history of salvation, of human redemption, both at the level of the incarnation, as husband of Mary and father of Jesus, and at the level of the Church's life, as its natural protector.

The pope stated the challenges facing the Church and urged Catholics to pray to Saint Joseph, as the patron of the Church:

The special motives for which St. Joseph has been proclaimed Patron of the Church, and from which the Church looks for singular benefit from his patronage and protection, are that Joseph was the spouse of Mary and that he was reputed the Father of Jesus Christ. From these sources have sprung his dignity, his holiness, his glory. ...Thus in giving Joseph the Blessed Virgin as spouse, God appointed him to be not only her life's companion, the witness of her maidenhood, the protector of her honour, but also, by virtue of the conjugal tie, a participator in her sublime dignity.

== Labor as a vocation ==
Leo was concerned with the industrial capitalism of the end of the nineteenth century and its treatment of workers. According to D. Stephen Long, Pope Leo "viewed labor not as a mere commodity subject to free competition, but as a dignified vocation." Referring to Saint Joseph, Pope Leo wrote, "[h]e set himself to protect with a mighty love and a daily solicitude his spouse and the Divine Infant; regularly by his work he earned what was necessary for the one and the other for nourishment and clothing"

Pope Leo saw the family as the foundation of Christianity and society, therefore, a wage sufficient to support the family was essential. Long explains that the Holy Family provides an example of the dignity of labor and the obligation of the employer to provide a living-wage. Leo opposes both capitalism's infringement on the family and socialism's call for common ownership. It is a subject Leo would expand upon two years later in Rerum novarum.

The pope then prescribed that during October, a prayer to Saint Joseph be added to the Rosary and granted an indulgence of seven years and seven Lents for each such act; the prayer remains enriched with a partial indulgence in the current Enchiridion Indulgentiarum.

== See also ==
- Josephology
- List of encyclicals of Pope Leo XIII
- Redemptoris Custos
