= Saint Joseph with the Christ Child =

17th century paintings by Guido Reni

Saint Joseph with the Christ Child refers to a series of three works by Guido Reni. The earliest dates to c. 1625-1630 and is in the Diocesan Museum of Milan, whilst a 1635 version is now in the Hermitage Museum and a c.1640 version in the Houston Museum of Fine Arts.

== Gallery ==
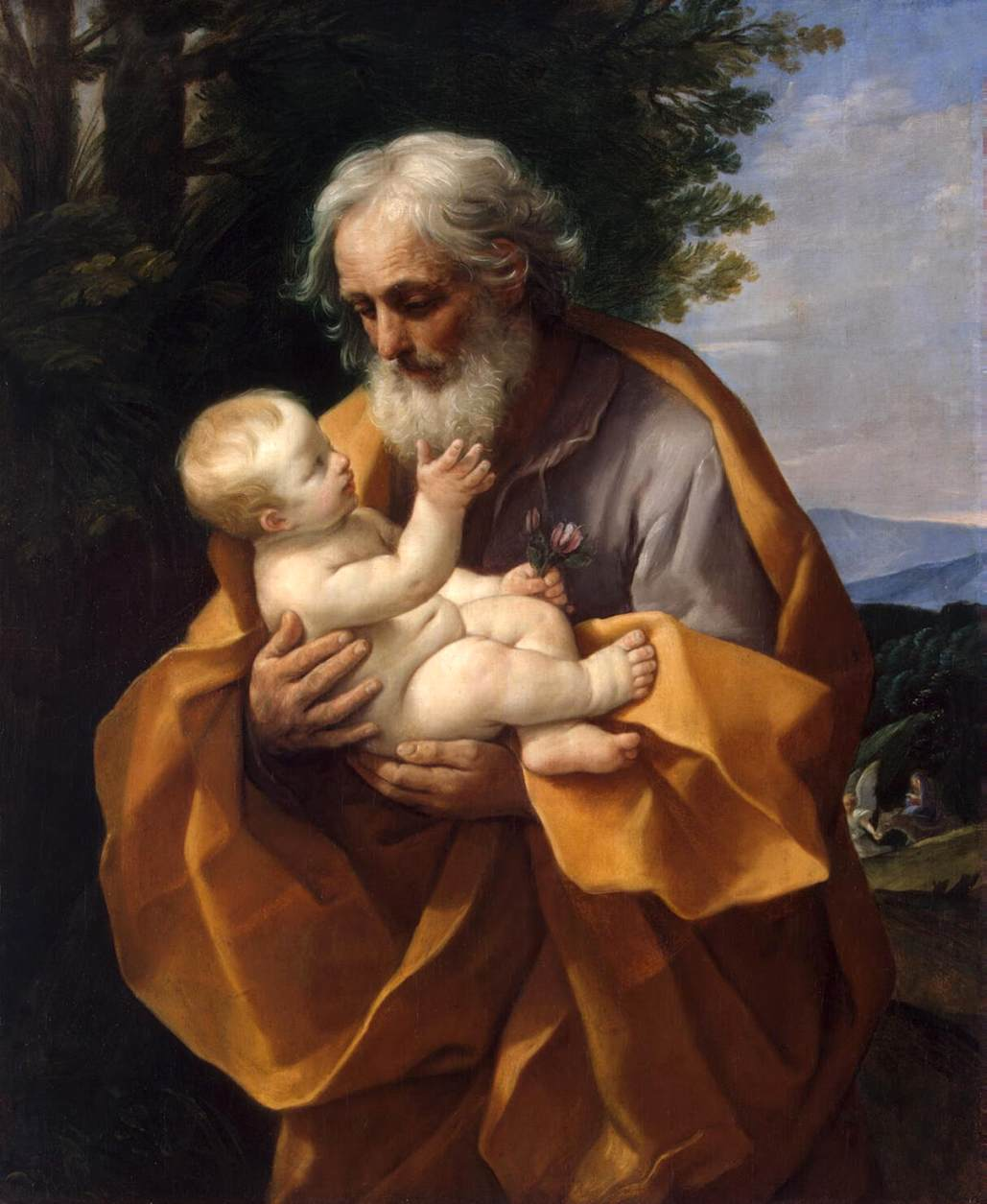
Hermitage

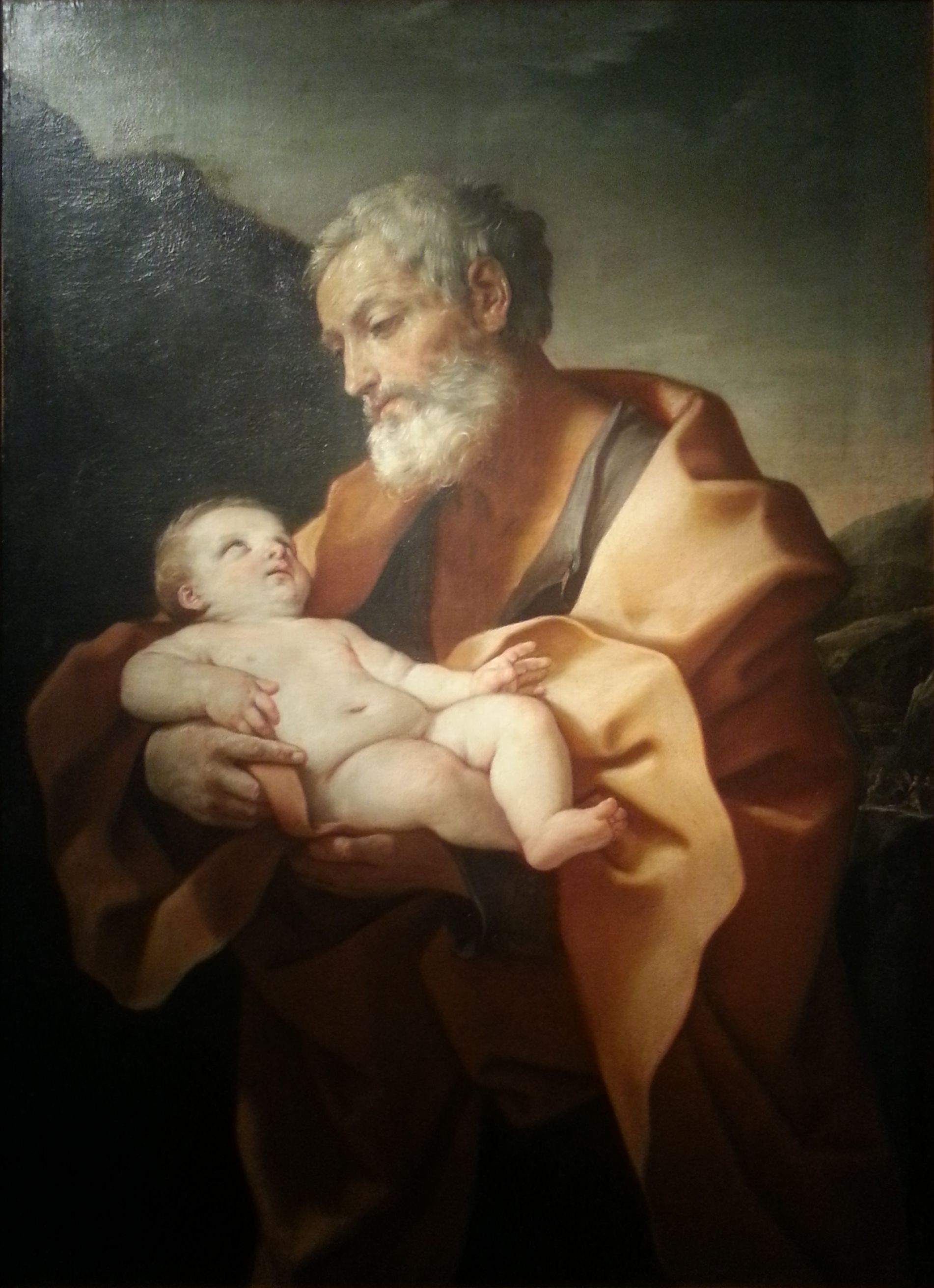
Milan

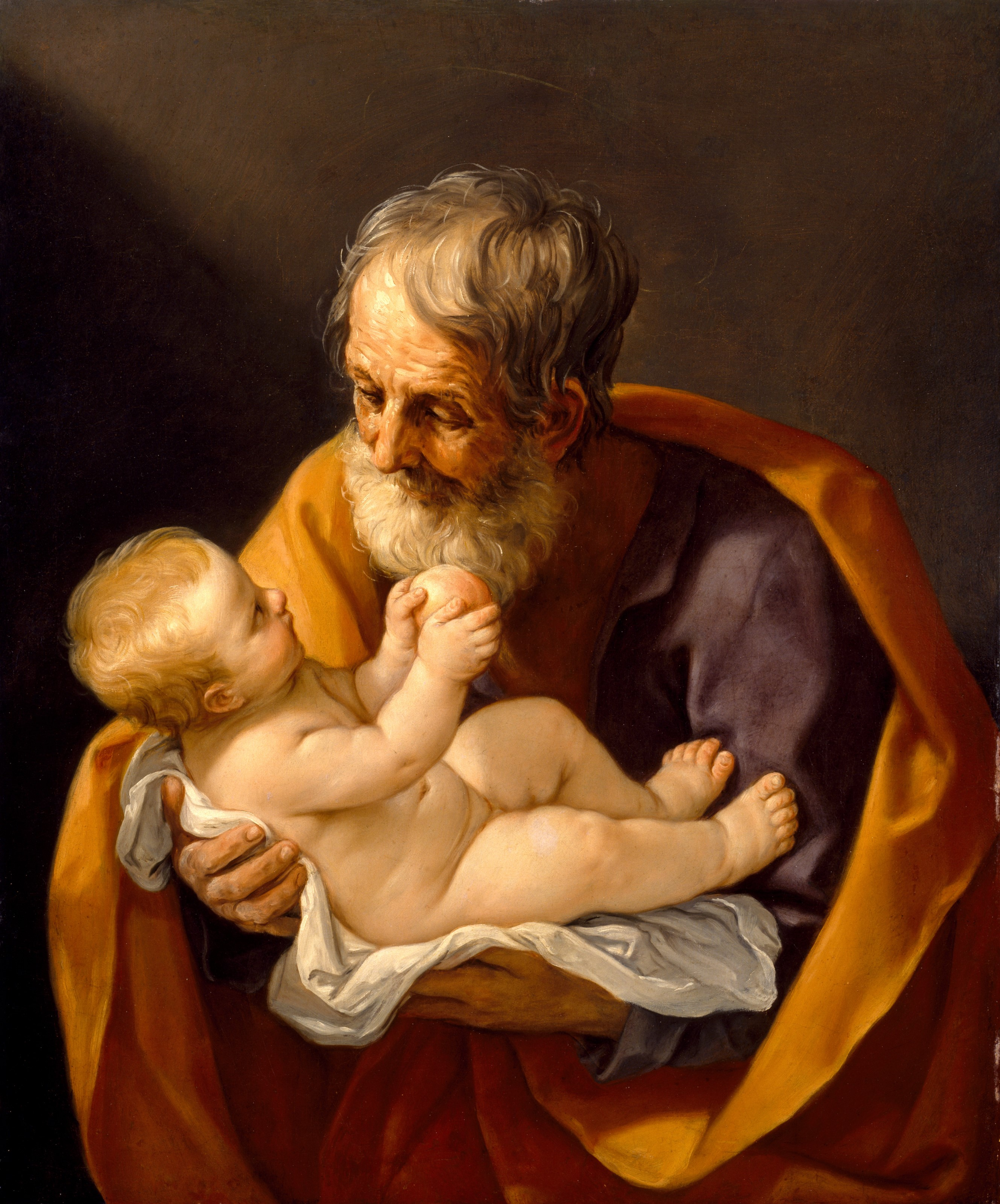
Houston
