= The Holy Family with a Little Bird =

Painting by Bartolomé Esteban Murillo

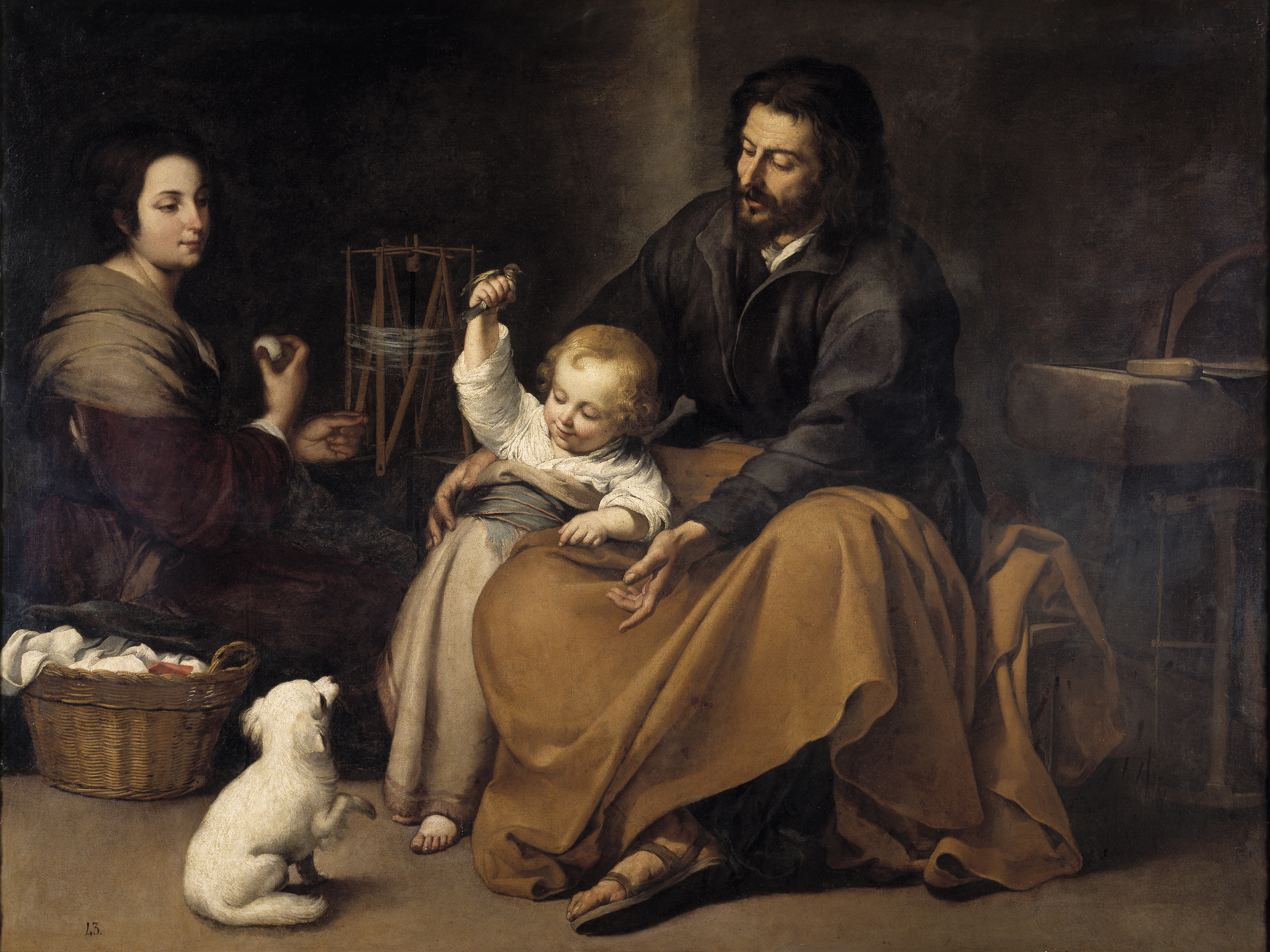
- Artist: Bartolomé Esteban Murillo
- Year: c. 1650
- Medium: Oil on canvas
- Dimensions: 144 cm × 188 cm (57 in × 74 in)
- Location: Museo del Prado; Madrid

The Holy Family with a Little Bird is a c.1650 oil on canvas painting by Bartolomé Esteban Murillo, acquired for the Spanish royal collection by Elisabeth Farnese in 1744 and now in the Prado Museum in Madrid. It shows Saint Joseph, the Virgin Mary and the Christ Child.
