= San José de Gracia =

San José de Gracia may refer to several places in Mexico:

== Aguascalientes ==
- San José de Gracia, Aguascalientes
- San José de Gracia (municipality)

== Jalisco ==
- San Jose de Gracia, Jalisco

== Michoacán ==
- San José de Gracia, Michoacán

== See also ==
- San José (disambiguation)
