= Introduction to the Devout Life =

1609 book by Francis de Sales

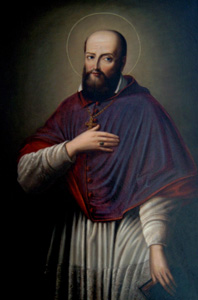
Saint Francis de Sales

An Introduction to the Devout Life (French: Introduction à la vie dévote) is a book written by Saint Francis de Sales, the first edition being published in 1609. The final edition was published in 1619, prior to the death of Francis in 1622. It enjoyed wide popularity, and was well received in both Protestant and Catholic circles, evidenced by its translation into all major languages of the day. It is typically categorized as a form of reading known as lectio divina ("divine reading"), based on the Christian monastic practice of spiritual reading. Like The Imitation of Christ by Thomas a Kempis, it is considered a spiritual classic in the Christian tradition. The work is also used as a guide in Christian spiritual direction.

== Background ==
During his lifetime, Francis de Sales gave spiritual direction to many individuals. Introduction to the Devout Life is a compilation of letters and notes used in the spiritual direction of his cousin, Madame Marie de Charmoisy, the wife of an ambassador of the Duke of Savoy. The correspondence began when Madame de Charmoisy, in Annecy, confided to Francis her desire for piety amidst the struggles and distractions associated with life at court. When Madame de Charmoisy returned to Paris, she showed the letters to her confessor, Jesuit Father Jean Fourier, who encouraged De Sales to publish them. It was first published in January 1609.

== Purpose ==
While the letters are addressed to "Philothea" (Lover of God), they include the substance of correspondence with others as well as Marie de Charmoisy. De Sales explained: "I address my words to Philothea, since I wish to direct what was first written to one person alone to the general benefit of many souls; ..."

Unlike many other writings in this category, it is distinguished by addressing itself to all Christians in any state of life, rather than to just those who have been called to a religious vocation. Charles Borromeo had a great influence on Francis de Sales because of his pastoral approach to bringing devotion to the Christian in the world.

De Sales said, "My purpose is to instruct those who live in town, within families, or at court, and are obliged to live an ordinary life as to outward appearances." "It is an error, or rather a heresy, to wish to banish the devout life from the regiment of soldiers, the mechanic's shop, the court of princes, or the home of married people. ... Wherever we may be, we can and should aspire to the perfect life."

== Content ==
The "Introduction" is composed of five parts or "books", each pertaining to a stage in the Christian's spiritual journey.

- Part I: Attaining a Firm Resolution to the Devout Life
- Part II: Prayer and the Sacraments
- Part III: The Practice of Virtue (patience, meekness, humility, obedience, chastity, and poverty)
- Part IV: Some Ordinary Temptations and how to overcome them
- Part V: Renewing and Confirming the Soul in Devotion

== Style ==
Francis saw the pursuit of holiness as something possible to each and every Christian, regardless of vocation, temperament or age. He presents spirituality in simple, ordinary French with references to images from daily life and popular and natural history. According to poet Kathleen Norris, "De Sales’s easy way of employing images from nature is one of the great pleasures of his book."

== Analysis ==
According to Mark Plaushin O.S.F.S., Francis De Sales' approach is "Christian humanism", an optimism about the human potential for cooperation with God toward redemption. Plaushin calls this "De Sales' most remarkable gift to the church."
