= Jesus Meets John the Baptist =

Painting by Guido Reni

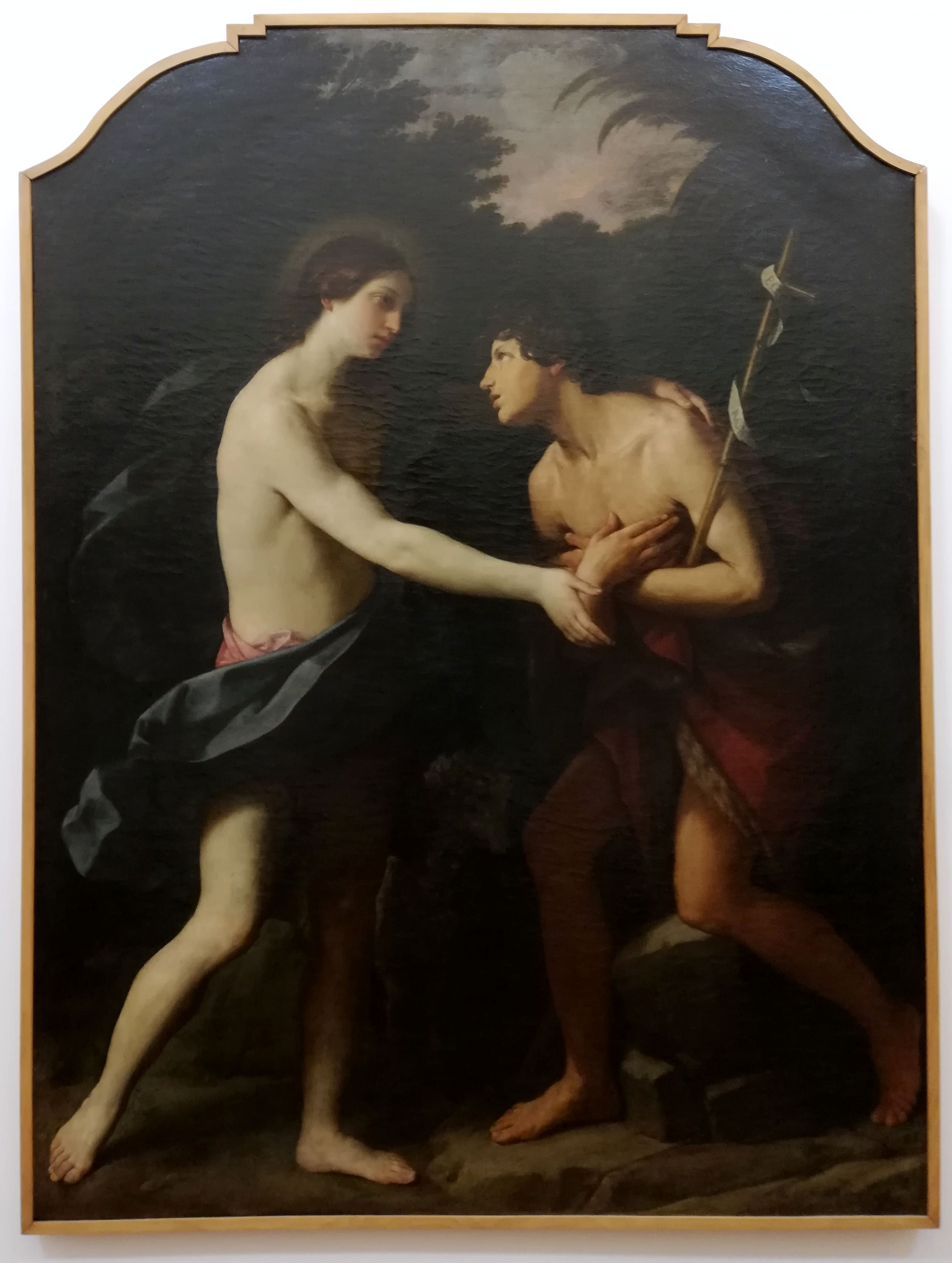
Jesus Meets John the Baptist (c. 1622) by Guido Reni

Jesus Meets John the Baptist is a c. 1622 oil on canvas painting by Guido Reni in the Girolamini, Naples, thought (with St. Francis in Ecstasy and The Flight into Egypt) to have been one of three works given to that complex by Domenico Lercaro.

== Bibliography ==
- (in Italian) Mario Borrelli, Contributo alla storia degli artefici minori e maggiori della mole Girolimiana, Napoli, 1968.
- (in Italian) Carlo Celano, Delle notitie del bello, dell'antico, e del curioso della città di Napoli, 1692.
