= The Flight into Egypt (Reni) =

Painting by Guido Reni

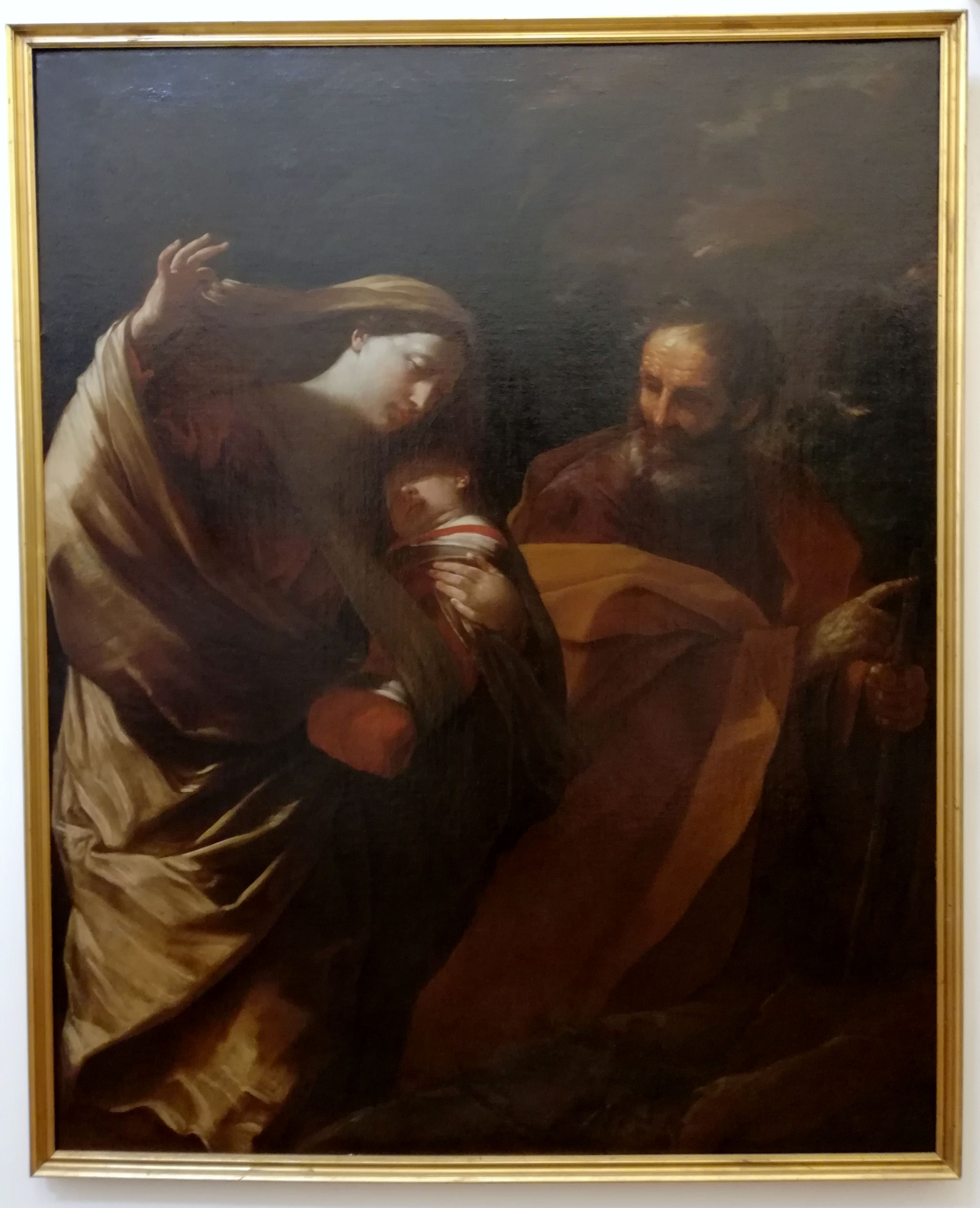
The Flight into Egypt (c. 1622) by Guido Reni

The Flight into Egypt is a c. 1622 oil on canvas painting by Guido Reni in the Girolamini, Naples in Naples.

Other versions of the work by Reni also survive. One contemparaneous with the Naples work was originally in the Colonna collection in Rome but is now in an English private collection and is mentioned by biographer Carlo Cesare Malvasia, with a putto at bottom right who is not shown in the Naples work, turning towards Mary and presenting her with a flower. Another version, identical to the Naples work but of lower quality, is in the Royal Museums of Fine Arts of Belgium.

== History ==
It was produced during Reni's second stay in Naples in 1621 to evaluate the possible commission to decorate the Royal Chapel of the Treasure of St. Januarius, which he later declined. The events linking the work to the Gioralmini complex are unknown, but they may be the same as those of two other Reni works now in that collection, namely the commission by Giovan Domenico Lercaro, a wealthy tailor and textile merchant from Monopoli in Apulia but active in Naples. That would make it and Reni's Jesus Meets John the Baptist and St. Francis in Ecstasy part of a donation of 57 works to the religious complex by Lercaro between 1622 and 1623. Lercaro's will stated that the collection of works donated to the complex had to be exhibited in the choir and sacristy, with Christ Meets John the Baptist taking pride of place above the oratory's high altar, used by the fathers for private devotion, whilst Flight was in the church's choir.

== Bibliography ==
- (in Italian) Mario Borrelli, Contributo alla storia degli artefici minori e maggiori della mole Girolimiana, Napoli, 1968.
- (in Italian) Carlo Celano, Delle notitie del bello, dell'antico, e del curioso della città di Napoli, 1692.
