= The Flagellation of Christ (Ribera) =

C.1618 painting by Jusepe de Ribera

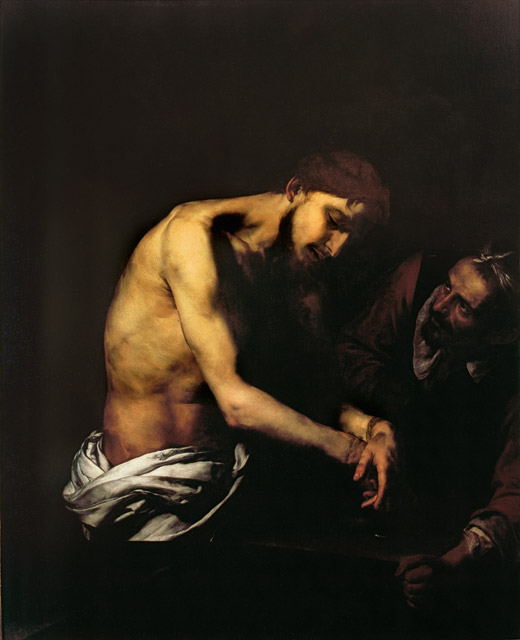

The Flagellation of Christ (known until the 1970s as Ecce Homo) is a c. 1618 oil on canvas painting by Jusepe de Ribera, from the start of his stay in Naples. A smaller autograph copy without the accompanying figure on the right is now in the Galleria Sabauda in Turin.

In 1622 a tailor and art collector left it and the rest of his collection to the Girolamini, Naples, where it still hangs. It is next mentioned in 1692 by Carlo Celano as being in the church's sacristy—he also gave it its erroneous title of Ecce Homo.
