= Flagellation of Christ (disambiguation) =

The Flagellation of Christ is a scene from the Passion of Christ.

Apart from many depictions in scenes in larger Passion cycles, Flagellation of Christ may also refer to:

- Flagellation of Christ (Piero della Francesca), a painting by Piero della Francesca
- The Flagellation of Christ (Caravaggio), a 1607 painting by Caravaggio
- The Flagellation of Christ (Ribera), a 1618 painting by de Ribera
