= Saint Francis in Ecstasy (Reni) =

Painting by Guido Reni

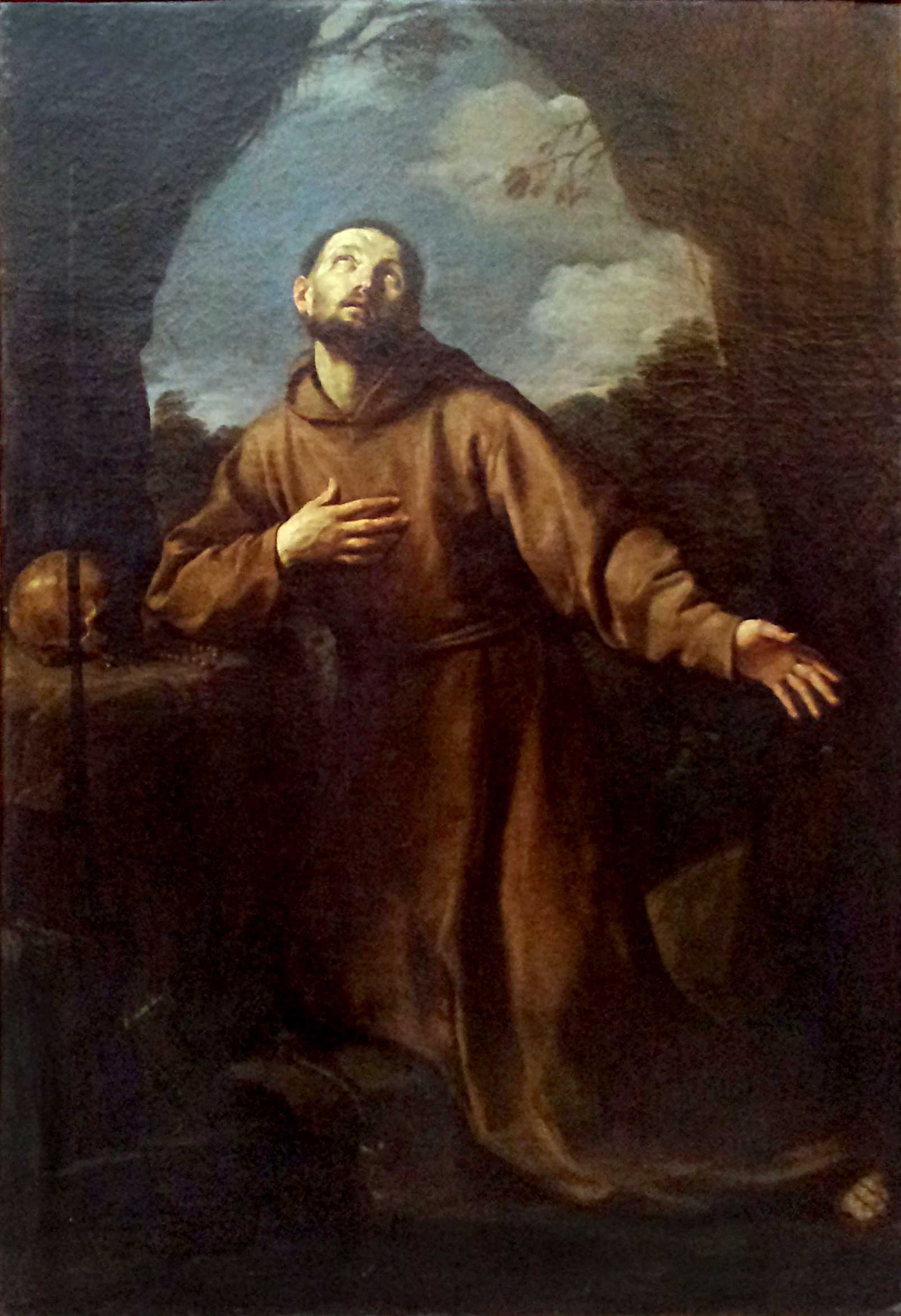
St. Francis in Ecstasy (1622) by Guido Reni

St. Francis in Ecstasy is a 1622 oil on canvas painting by Guido Reni, now in the Coppola Chapel (dedicated to the saint depicted) in Girolamini church in Naples, Italy.

== History ==
Its style is reminiscent of the same artist's The Mother in the Pinacoteca Nazionale di Bologna, thought to have been painted between 1615 and 1630. Reni's links to the Coppola family (if any) remain unknown. He was in Naples for ten years starting in 1612 to take part in painting the chapel of the treasure of Saint Januarius, but a 1626 inventory states that the painting was not yet in the Girolamini, although Carlo Celano mentioned viewing it in the chapel in 1692.

The art gallery of the Oratorians of Saint Philip Neri, known as the quadreria dei Girolamini, houses Reni's The Flight into Egypt and Jesus Meets John the Baptist. The famous clothing designer and rich textile merchant Domenico Lercaro left his whole art collection to the Oratorians in Naples (owners of the Girolamini) and a codicil to his will of 1622 states that Reni had already been paid at that date for three as-yet-undelivered works - one of John the Baptist, one of Saint Dominic and a third whose subject was not stated. A book of items leaving and joining the congregation between 1628 and 1633 mentions a Reni work arriving from his native Bologna. All these pieces of evidence led us to presume that St. Francis was part of Lercaro's collection and that it was given to the Oratorians around 1630 and later placed in the chapel where it now hangs.

== Bibliography ==
- (in Italian) Marco Liberato, 'La Cappella Coppola', in Monumento Nazionale dei Girolamini, Elio de Rosa, Naples, 2014
- (in Italian) S.Pepper, Guido Reni l'opera completa, Novare, 1988
- (in Italian) Bonaventura da Bagnoregio Vita del Serafico San Francesco tradotta in volgare, Heredi di Simon Galignani, Venise, 1593
