= Santa Maria della Colonna =

Church in Naples, Italy

Coordinates: 40.851374°N 14.258700°E

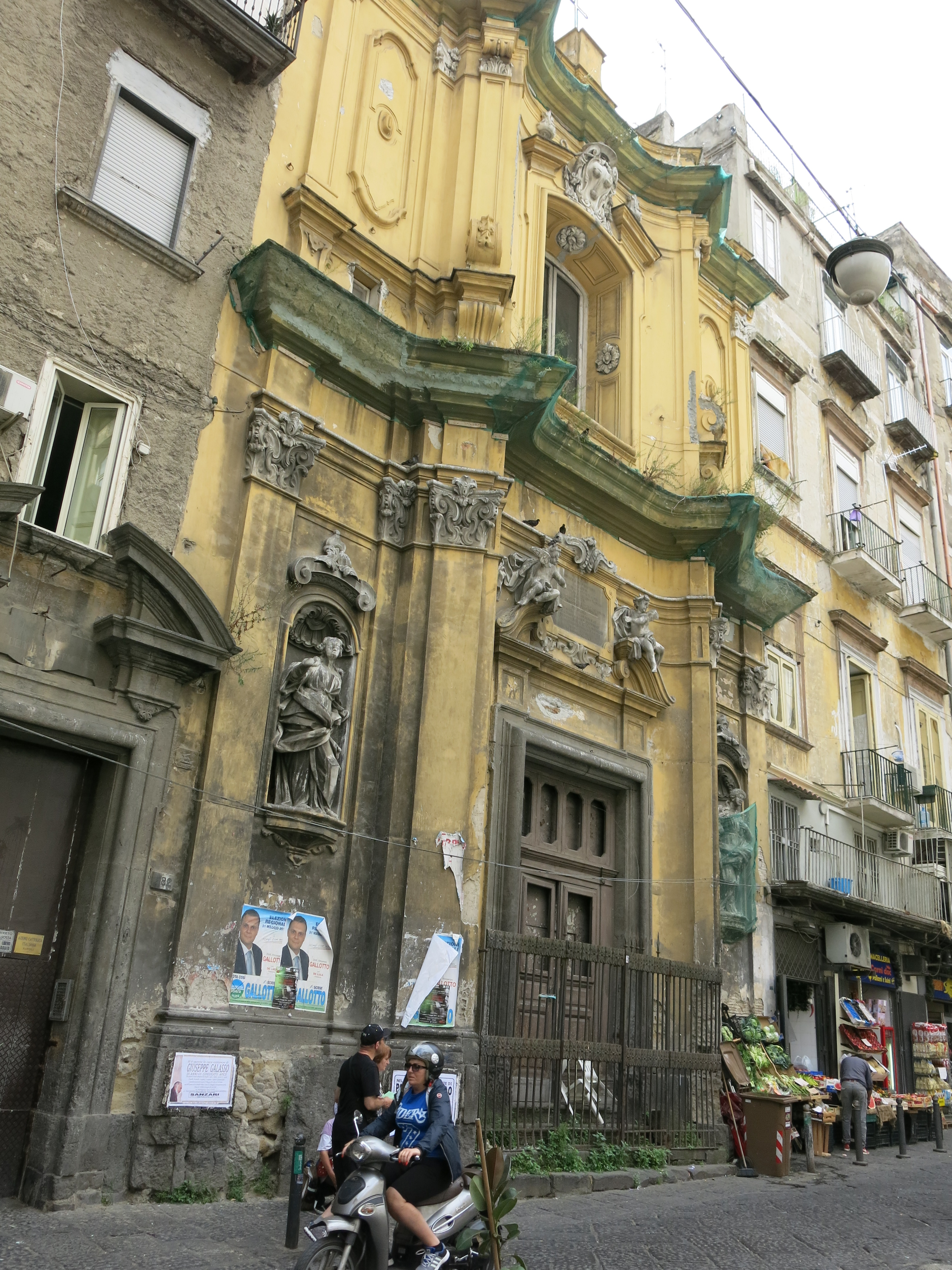
Facade

Santa Maria della Colonna is a Baroque style deconsecrated Roman Catholic church in central Naples, region of Campania, Italy. It stands across from the church of the Girolamini.

== History ==
The church construction began in 1580, as part of a religious complex meant to house an orphanage, and later dedicated as a conservatory of Music (Conservatori dei Poveri di Gesu, dissolved in 1714). The building was restored in the 18th century, and its elaborate decorated facade dates from 1715, built by Antonio Guidetti. In 1896, the church building was again restored.

The interior has a Greek cross plan and cupola. The interior was decorated by the stucco artist Costantino D'Adamo and the choir was made by Domenico Bertone. The church has frescoes by Paolo De Matteis. The church is rarely open and in poor upkeep. The attached complex is owned by the Suore di Calcutta.

With UNESCO funding, the church has undergone renovations and opened to public in 2018 September.

== See also ==
- 18th-century Western domes

== Bibliography ==
- Vincenzo Regina, Le chiese di Napoli. Viaggio indimenticabile attraverso la storia artistica, architettonica, letteraria, civile e spirituale della Napoli sacra, Newton e Compton editore, Napoli 2004.
