= Girolamini, Naples =

Church and ecclesiastical complex in Naples, Italy

Coordinates: 40°51′07″N 14°15′30″E

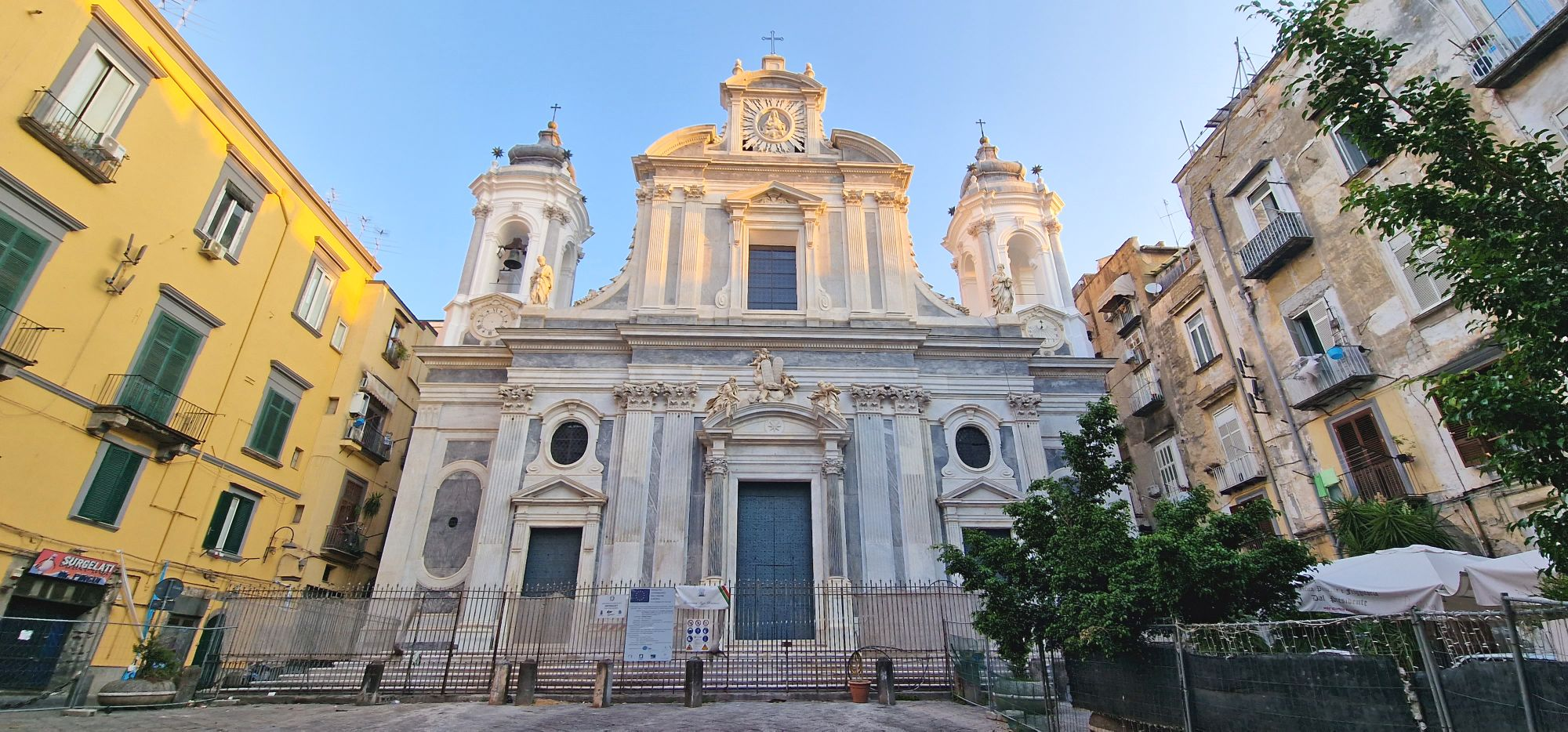
The conservative Late Baroque façade designed by Ferdinando Fuga belies its late date of 1780.

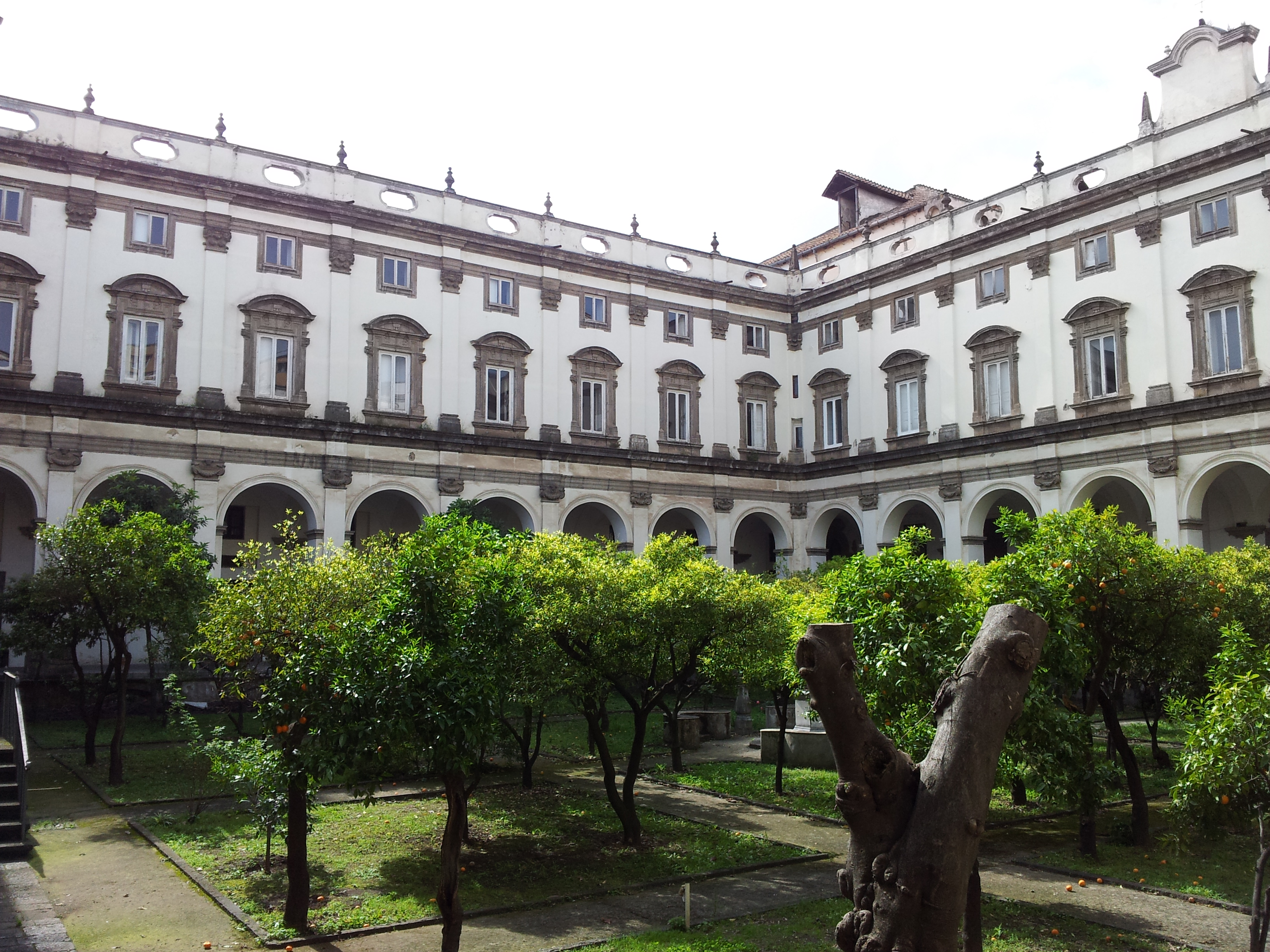
The 17th-century Chiostro degli Aranci is filled with the orange trees that have given it its informal designation.

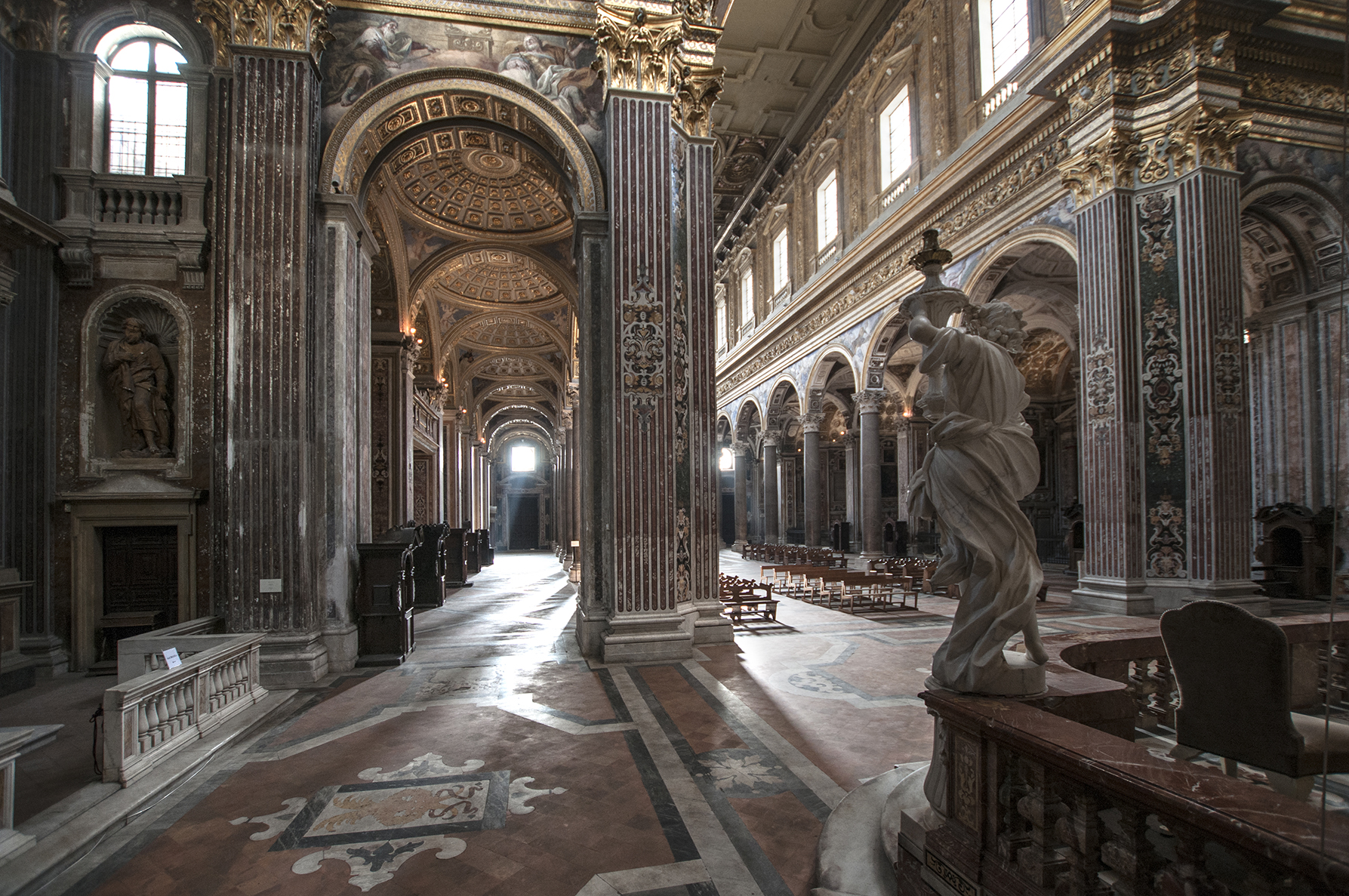
Interior

The Church of the Girolamini (also spelled Gerolomini), also known as the Church of Saint Philip Neri, is a church and ecclesiastical complex in Naples, Italy. It stands directly across from the Cathedral of Naples on Via Duomo. Its façade faces the square and the street of the same name (Via Tribunali), opposite Santa Maria della Colonna. The complex is located one block west of Via Duomo.

== History ==
The church was built site of an earlier building, the Palazzo Seripando, which was bought in 1586 with 5500 ducats for the priests of the Congregation of the Oratory of St Philip Neri. Archbishop Mario Carafa, had requested disciples from the order, and received the future cardinal Francesco Tarugi. Once the Palace was demolished, construction started in 1592 using by the Florentine architect Giovanni Antonio Dosio, with help by Nencioni. Completed in 1619, the church was in a sober Florentine Renaissance style, with a Latin cross with three naves supported by arcuated colonnades and with lateral chapels. It was initially consecrated to the Birth of the Virgin of and All Saints (Ognisanti).

There are two cloisters: the first cloister is called the "chiostro maiolicato" from its embedded maiolica tiles. A much larger second 17th-century cloister, is accessible through the first; this cloister hosts the entry to both the "Quadreria" or art collection, which had been previously housed in the sacristy of the Church, and the magnificent library of the Oratorian Fathers, the Biblioteca Girolamini, now run by the Italian state. The façade and other reconstructions were completed by Ferdinando Fuga in 1780. The façade statues of St Peter or St Paul were sculpted by Giuseppe Sammartino.

The Church and the convent gallery contain works by major artists. The lavish gilt ceiling was badly damaged during aerial bombardment in February 1944, but has been partially restored.

The church counterfacade has a Giordano painting of Jesus ejects the moneylenders from the Temple. The lateral doors have frescoes of Heliodorus and the Angel and Oza morto presso l’Arca by Filippo Mazzante. The first chapel on the right has an altarpiece depicting Saints Giorgio and Pantaleone by the Bolognese Gaetano Pandolfi; to the side are paintings of St Dominic and the Guardian Angel are by Francesco Fracanzano, pupil of Ribera; above is a painting of Saints Cosma and Damiano by Benasca. The 2nd chapel on the right has a small Madonna della Neve by a follower of Polidoro di Caravaggio, the paintings of God and Sts Anne and Joseph are by Giuseppe Marulli. Francesco di Maria painted St Anne and S. Gioacchino with the Angel. The paintings in the 3rd chapel are by Luca Giordano. The 4th chapel on the right has a St Agnese, by Cristoforo Roncalli (il Pomarancio). Giovanni Battista Vico and his wife, Caterina Destito have funereal plaques in this chapel. The 5th chapel has a St. Francis in Ecstasy by Guido Reni. The frescoes in this chapel are by Morandi. The canvas of the Virgin and Apostles in the sixth chapel was painted by Paolo de Matteis, while Francesco la Mura painted the lateral canvases.

The church and complex take their name of Girolamini from that which was first applied to the priests of the Oratory and which is derived from the Church of San Girolamo della Carità in Rome, where St Philip Neri first established his religious exercises.

== Sacristy ==
Entered from the right transept, the sacristy displays a series of painting including a St. Francis in Ecstasy (1622) and Jesus meets St John the Baptist (1622) by Guido Reni, and a St. Nicholas of Bari saves three children from a vat, San Carlo Borromeo kisses the hand of St Phillip Neri, St Charles Borromeo and St. Philip Neri by Giordano. The next room has a ceiling fresco depicting the Glory of St Philip Neri by Beinaschi.

== Biblioteca Girolamini ==
The Biblioteca Girolamini is the library associated with the church since the 16th century. It previously contained thousands of manuscripts and printed volumes.

=== Looting in 2012 ===
In December 2013, it was reported that there had been systematic looting of the Biblioteca Girolamini. Images showed empty shelves and tables piled with papers. Senior Police investigator, Major Antonio Coppola, was quoted as saying, "Our investigations found that there was a true criminal system in action," and that "A group of people... carried out a devastating, systematic looting of the library." The report stated that Professor Tomaso Montanari, an art historian and academic, first alerted the police to what was happening, after having gained access to the library along with a student in early 2012. The Professor said, "One of the library's members of staff took me aside, away from the CCTV cameras, and said: 'Professor, the director (Marino Massimo de Caro) has been looting the library!'" de Caro had been appointed in 2011.

De Caro was arrested soon after investigations began in 2012. Investigations showed that vehicle-loads of books had been removed and sold by the now-convicted criminals, who had waited until after normal working hours, turned off the rudimentary CCTV system, and then proceeded with their looting.

De Caro was convicted along with accomplices in early 2013 and sentenced to seven years jail, although, due to his cooperation this was commuted to house arrest. Around 80% of the lost volumes had been recovered by late 2013, with the assistance of antiquarian booksellers and collectors, although many valuable artefacts remain unaccounted for.

In 2019 Giancarlo Petrella published about incunabula at the library based on early catalogs.

== See also ==
- 17th-century Western domes

== Gallery ==
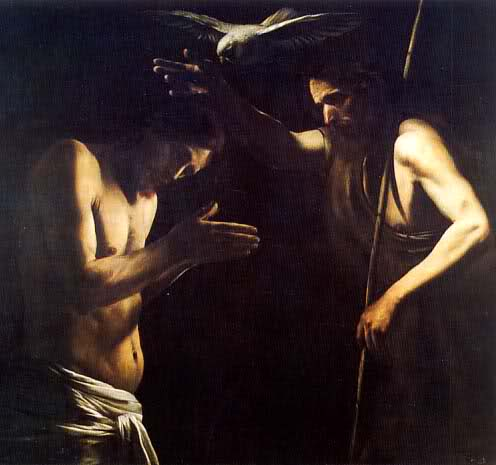
Baptism of Christ by Battistello Caracciolo

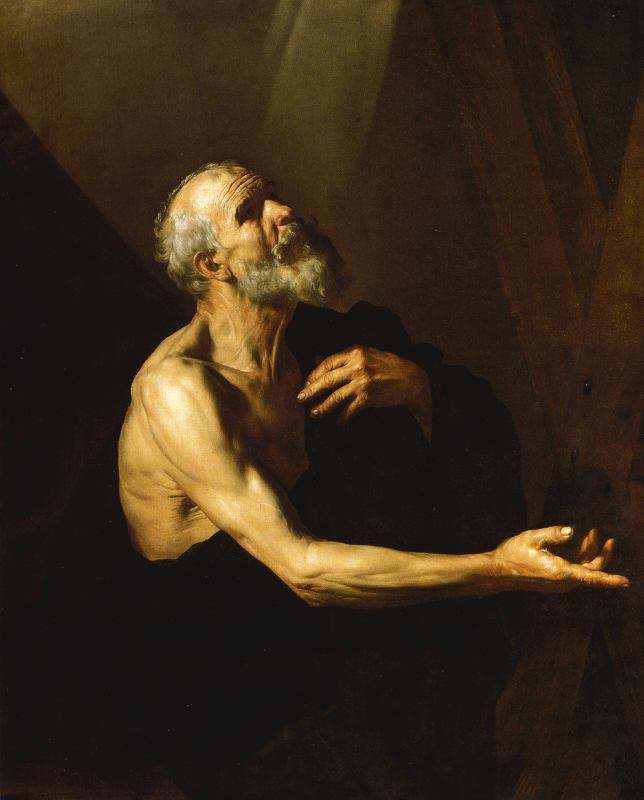
St Andrew by Jose Ribera

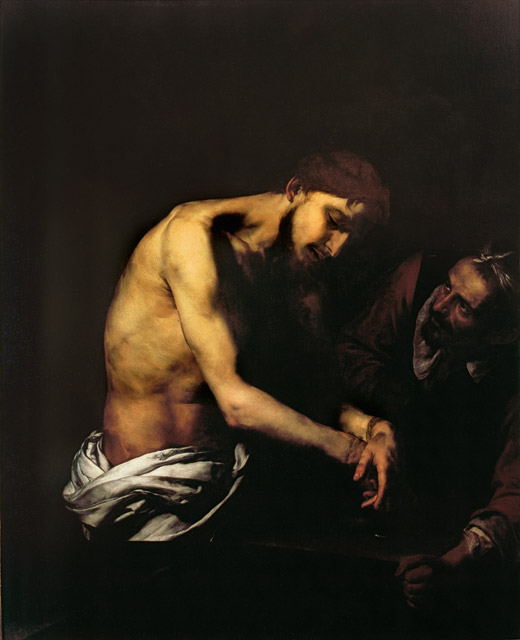
Flagellation of Christ by Jose Ribera

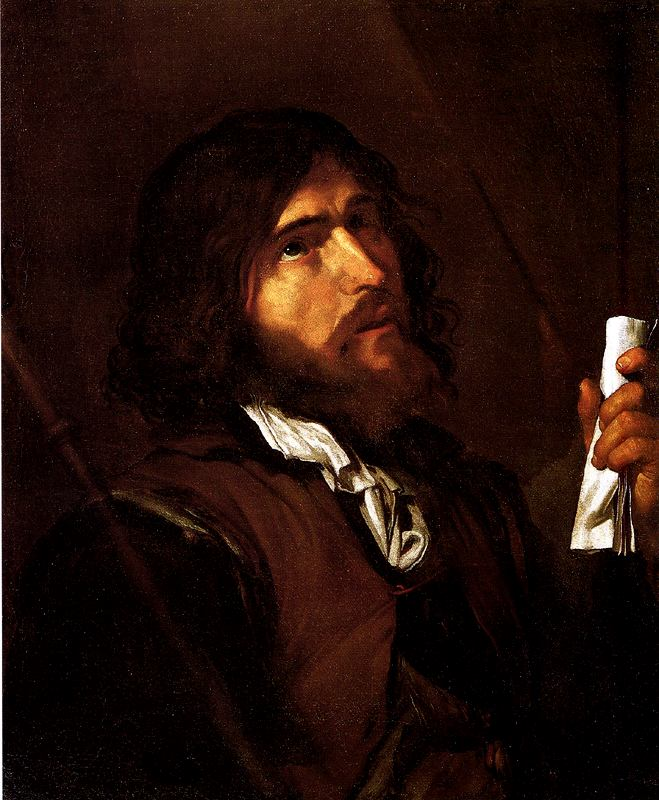
St James by Jose Ribera

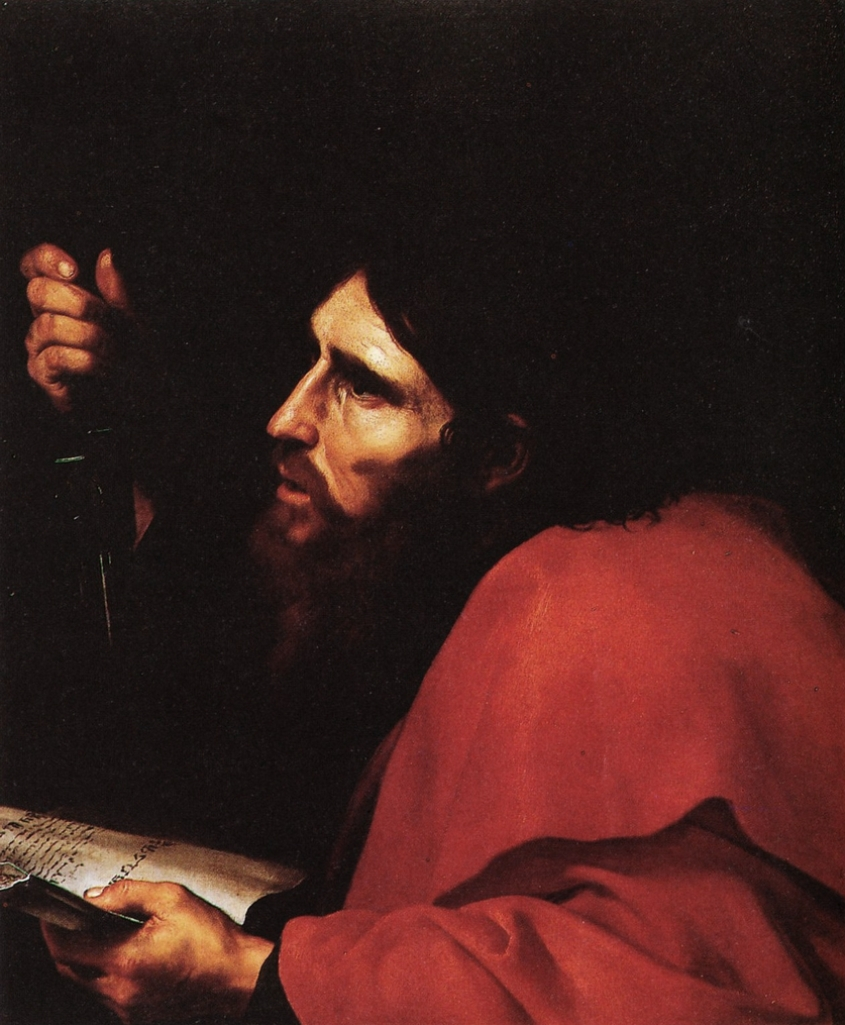
St Paul by Jose Ribera

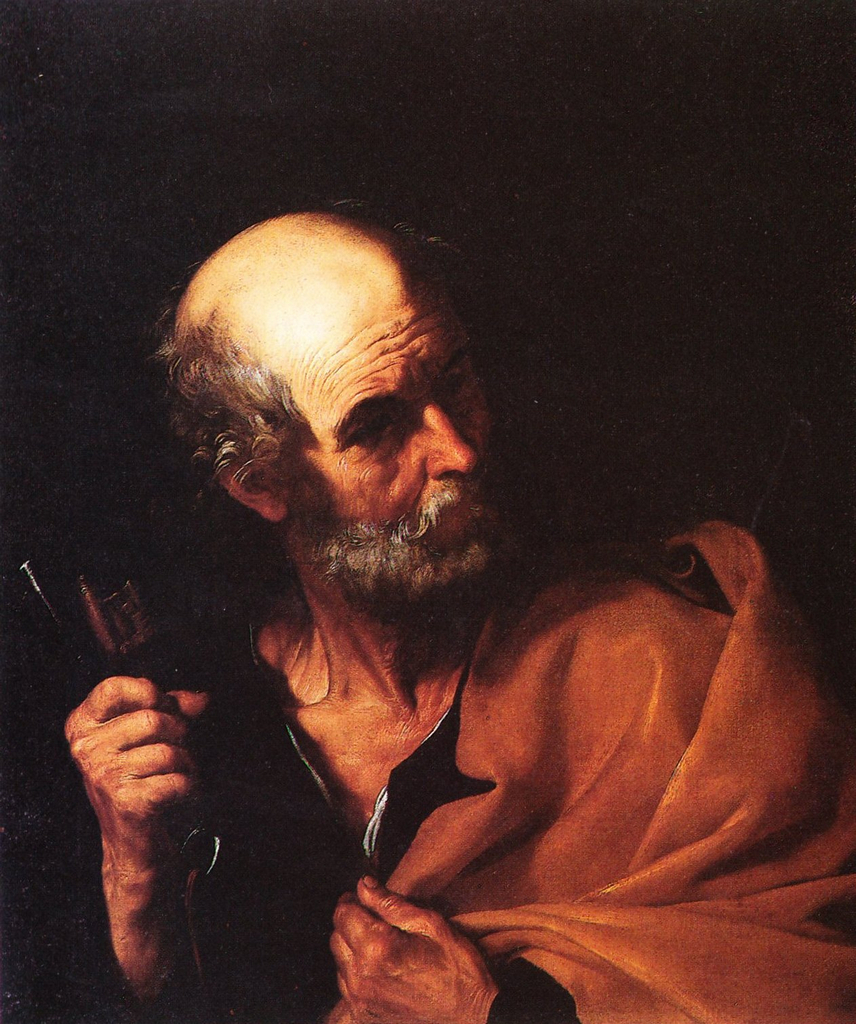
St Peter by Jose Ribera

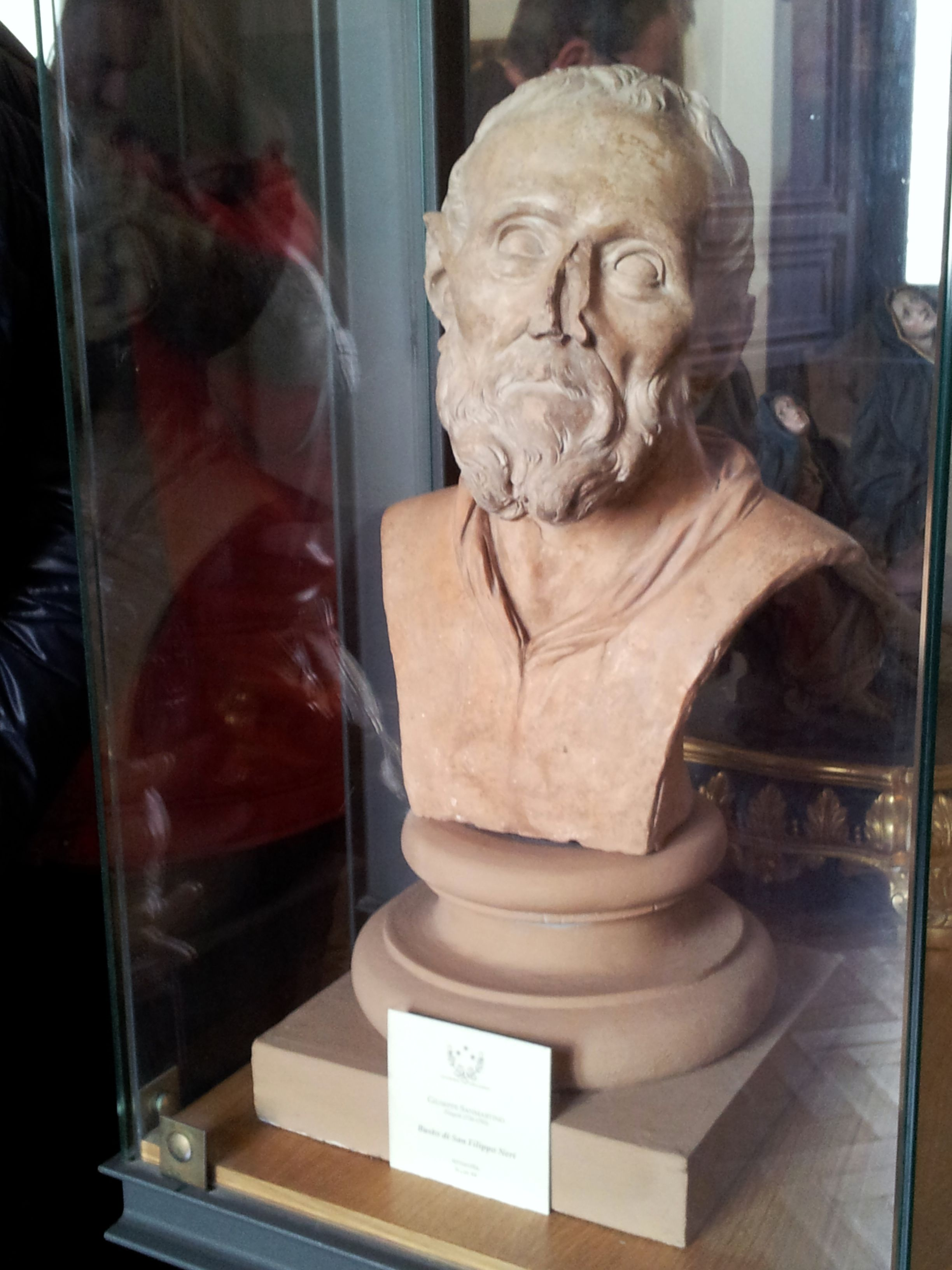
St Phillip Neri by Sammartino

== Sources ==
- A new guide of Naples, its environs, Procida, Ischia and Capri: Compiled ...By Mariano Vasi, page 286, by Giovanni Battista de Ferrari. 1826 Naples.
