= Carlo Celano =

Italian lawyer and man of letters (1625 – 1693

Reverend Carlo Celano
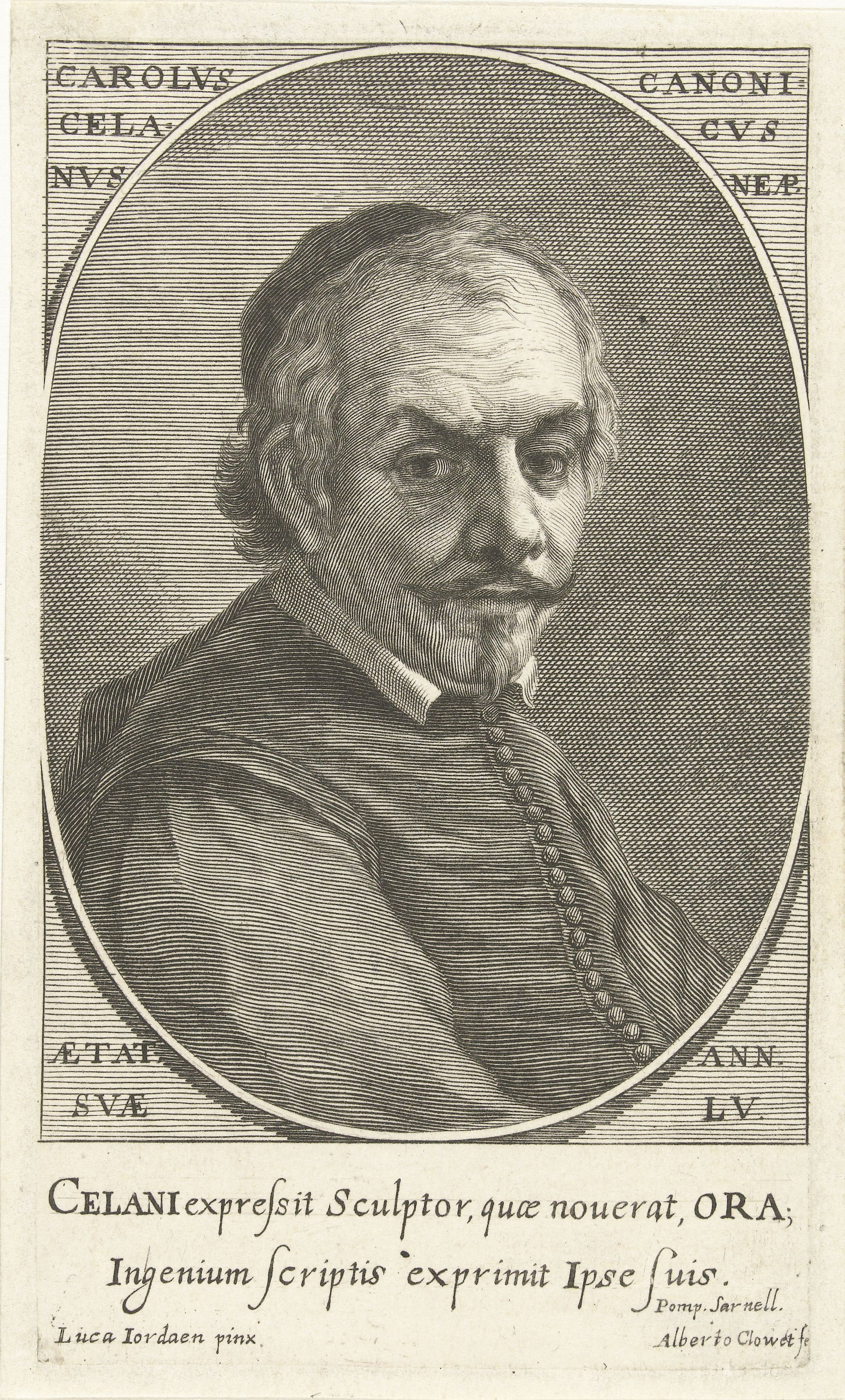
- Engraved portrait of Celano in the Rijksmuseum
- Born: February 22, 1625; Naples, Kingdom of Naples
- Died: 3 December 1693 (aged 68); Naples, Kingdom of Naples
- Resting place: Santa Restituta
- Occupations: Canon, art historian, archaeologist, man of letters
- Parent(s): Salvatore Celano and Antonia Celano (née Picaccia)

Academic background
- Education: University of Naples Federico II

Carlo Celano (22 February 1625 – 3 December 1693) was an Italian lawyer and man of letters, who led the restoration of the church of Santa Restituta in his birthplace of Naples and left an accurate census of the city's monuments, updated up to the end of the 17th century.

== Life ==
Born to Antonia Picaccia and her doctor husband Salvatore, he inherited a taste for architecture, history and art from his father, expanding it by long journeys through Naples and excursions to its catacombs. He studied under his father and the Jesuits before graduating from university in law. He immediately began both to work as a lawyer and to write poetry and prose. He was forced to give up his legal job due to an incident in court and suspicions that he had taken part in the Masaniello revolt - the latter led him to be imprisoned in Naples' jail, the Vicaria, until an influential friend secured his release.

Around 1660 he decided to take religious vows and to enter the congregation of the apostolic missions in Naples. He immediately took on positions of responsibility and soon archbishop Ascanio Filomarino made him a canon of Naples Cathedral. He continued writing and publishing under the pseudonym 'Ettore Calcolona', especially stage comedies inspired by Lope de Vega, Calderòn de la Barca and other Spanish writers, which he published to some acclaim. His satire Degli avanzi delle Poste, in which he imagined publishing letters that were never delivered and mounted up at post offices, was a sharp critique of fashions and social behaviour at the time. He also moved in cultural circles, visiting Luca Giordano's studio and hosting lawyer Francesco Valletta's intellectual salons, at which he met the historian Jean Mabillon, for whom he acted as cicerone during Mabillon's grand tour and by whom he his mentioned as an expert on ancient Naples. Celano became involved in fundraising to repair Santa Restituta after the 5 June 1688 earthquake and in mid 1689 he was chosen to join its repair committee and put in charge of the works - the reopening occurred on 24 May 1692. Celano died in Naples in 1693.

== Works ==
=== Notizie ===
At the same time as the restoration work he published his most important work, Le Notizie del bello, dell'antico e del curioso della città di Napoli (Notices on what is beautiful, ancient and curious in the city of Naples), dedicated to Pope Innocent XII. The work's main aim was to describe ten itineraries for foreign visitors to the city. It was a true guidebook, based on immense research and minutely describing culture, art and architecture in the city, with especial attention to non-religious buildings.

It went through three editions in the 17th century alone, with one more in the 18th century, edited by Giovanbattista Chiarini. That last edition was last reprinted in 2000 and moved the work's authorship more towards Chiarini himself, using Celano's work as a basic structure for his own. A critical edition of the most substantial 18th-century reprint, that of 1792, has recently been edited by Gianpasquale Greco, also containing all the additions (i.e. the updates) of the other two 18th-century reprints and also including the Notizie sulle reali ville (an 18th-century text supplementing the 1792 edition, dedicated to the royal foundations in the Bourbon era).

=== Other works ===
- Non è padre essendo Re
- Gli effetti della cortesia
- Dell'amare l'ardire
- La pietà trionfante
- La forza della fedeltà
- Degli avanzi delle Poste
- Corso Politico nei Ginnasi Delphici del Gran Alfonso Primo Re di questo nome in Napoli
- Lettere Spirituale e Morale in diversi soggetti
