= Juan Mateos (courtier) =

Spanish hunter & arbalist (1575–1643)

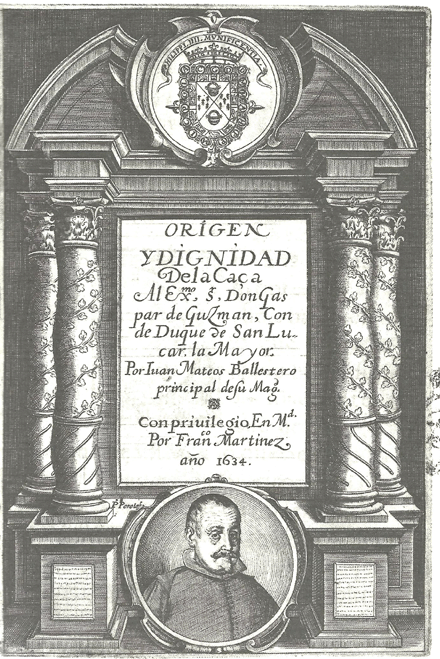
- Cover of Origen y dignidad de la caça with a portrait of Mateos by Pedro Perete, Madrid, 1634, National Library of Spain.
- Born: 1575; Villanueva del Fresno
- Died: 15 August 1643 (aged 68); Madrid
- Notable work: Origen y dignidad de la caça
- Spouse: María Marquart
- Father: Gonzalo Mateos

Juan Mateos (c. 1575 – 15 August 1643) was a horseback hunter and the principal arbalist of Philip IV of Spain. In 1634, he authored Origen y dignidad de la caça (Origin and Dignity of Hunting), a hunting treatise dedicated to the Count-Duke of Olivares. In his dedication he said, "I write solely what I have done, and what I have seen; and what I have seen, do." (Spanish: yo eſcrivo ſolamente lo que he hecho, y lo que he viſto; y lo que he viſto hazer.)

== Background ==
He was the son of Gonzalo Mateos, senior arbalist to the Marquis of Villanueva del Fresno from 1601 to 1606, i.e., while the Spanish Royal Court was in Valladolid. Mateos entered the service of Margaret of Austria as a crossbowman and hunter. Upon her death in 1611, he entered the service of her husband, Philip III, and later the service of their son Philip IV.

Mateos' likeness is known through a bust portrait engraved by Pedro Perete that appears on the front of Origen y dignidad de la caça, one of whose illustrations is signed by painter Francisco Collantes. Based on that engraving, art historian Carl Justi identified Mateos as the model of an unfinished portrait of a gentleman cut below the waist painted by Velázquez around 1632 (Don Juan Mateos, in the Gemäldegalerie Alte Meister), and, in the opinion of Enriqueta Harris, Mateos is one of the characters depicted with the Count-Duke of Olivares and Alonso Martínez de Espinar in Prince Baltasar Carlos in the Riding School.

He died in Madrid on 15 August 1643. Among the properties inventoried at his death were two full-length oil portraits, one of his wife María and the other of him, probably the Don Juan Mateos, though the name of the painter is not indicated; these were valued at 100 reales.
