= Spanish Baroque literature =

Literary movement

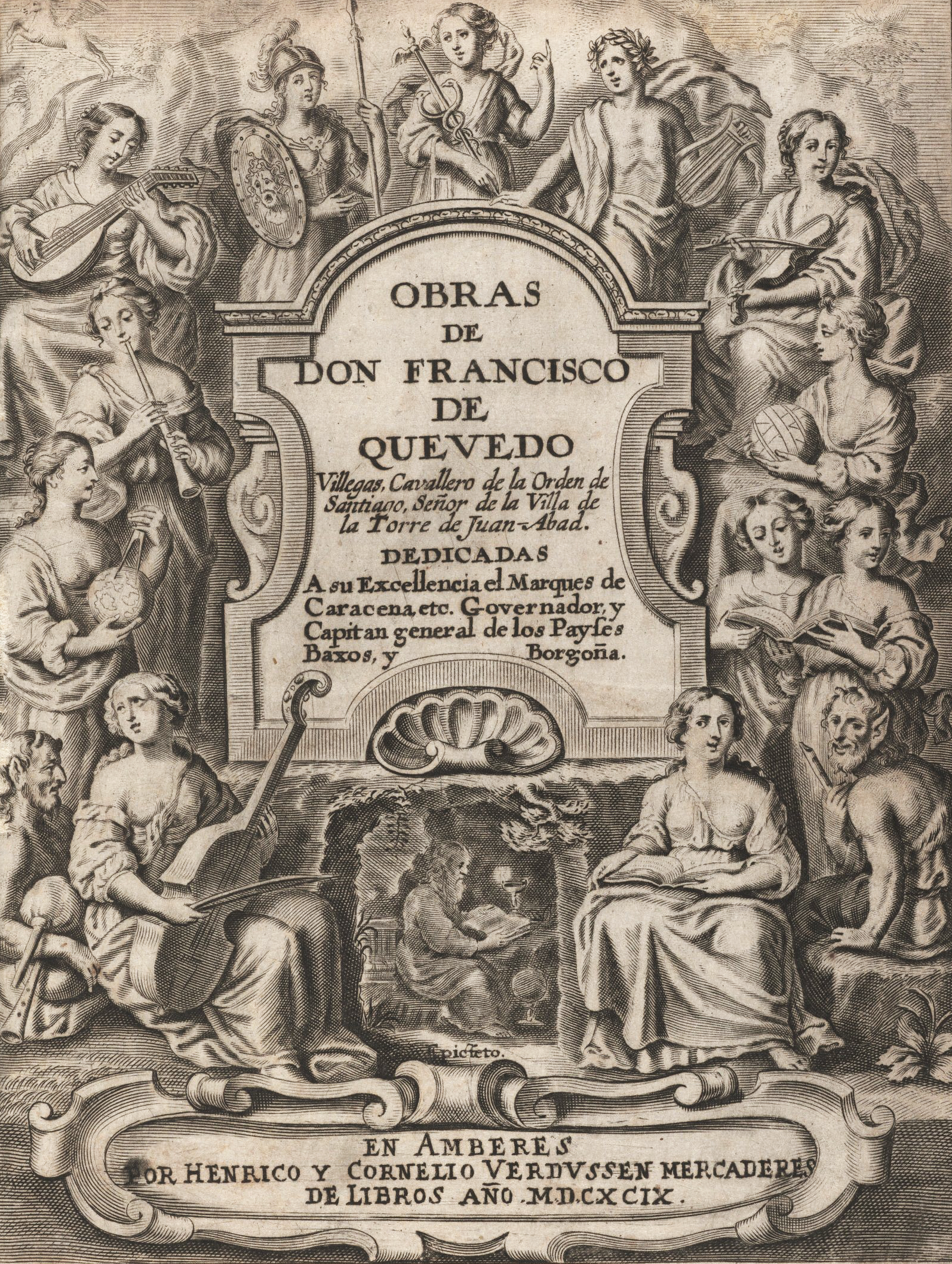
Works from don Francisco de Quevedo Villegas, 1699

Spanish Baroque literature is the literature written in Spain during the Baroque, which occurred during the 17th century in which prose writers such as Baltasar Gracián and Francisco de Quevedo, playwrights such as Lope de Vega, Tirso de Molina, Calderón de la Barca and Juan Ruiz de Alarcón, or the poetic production of the aforementioned Francisco de Quevedo, Lope de Vega and Luis de Góngora reached their zenith. Spanish Baroque literature is a period of writing which begins approximately with the first works of Luis de Góngora and Lope de Vega, in the 1580s, and continues into the late 17th century.

The fundamental characteristics of Spanish Baroque literature are the progressive complexity in formal resources and a theme centered on the concern for the passage of time and the loss of confidence in the Neoplatonic ideals of the Renaissance. Likewise, the variety and diversity in the subjects dealt with, the attention to detail and the desire to attract a wide audience, of which the rise of the Lope de Vega comedies are an example. From the dominant sensual concern in the 16th century, there was an emphasis on moral values and didactics, where two currents converge: Neostoicism and Neoepicureism. El Criticón from Baltasar Gracián is a point of arrival in the baroque reflection on man and the world, the awareness of disappointment, a vital pessimism and a general crisis of values.

The genres are mixed, Luis de Góngora wrote lyrical poetry of the Fábula de Polifemo y Galatea that makes virtue of difficulty, with romances and burlesque satirical works, of wide popular diffusion and the two currents are hybridized in the Fábula de Príamo y Tisbe; Quevedo wrote metaphysical and moral poems, while writing about vulgar and popular matters.

The Spanish Baroque theater configures a popular scene that has endured as a classic production for future theater. The philosophical dramas of Calderón de la Barca, of which Life Is a Dream is an outstanding example, represent a zenith in Spanish dramatic production and is part of a period of splendor that receives the generic name of the Spanish Golden Age.

== Characteristics of the Baroque ==
The Baroque is characterized by the following features:

- Pessimism: The Renaissance had been not in its purpose of imposing the harmony and the perfection over the world, as the humanists tried, and neither had made man happier; war and social inequalities continued; misery and calamity were common throughout Europe. An intellectual pessimism became more and more marked, together with a carefree character (of which the period's comedies and rogue narrations - on which the picaresque novels are based) give testimony.

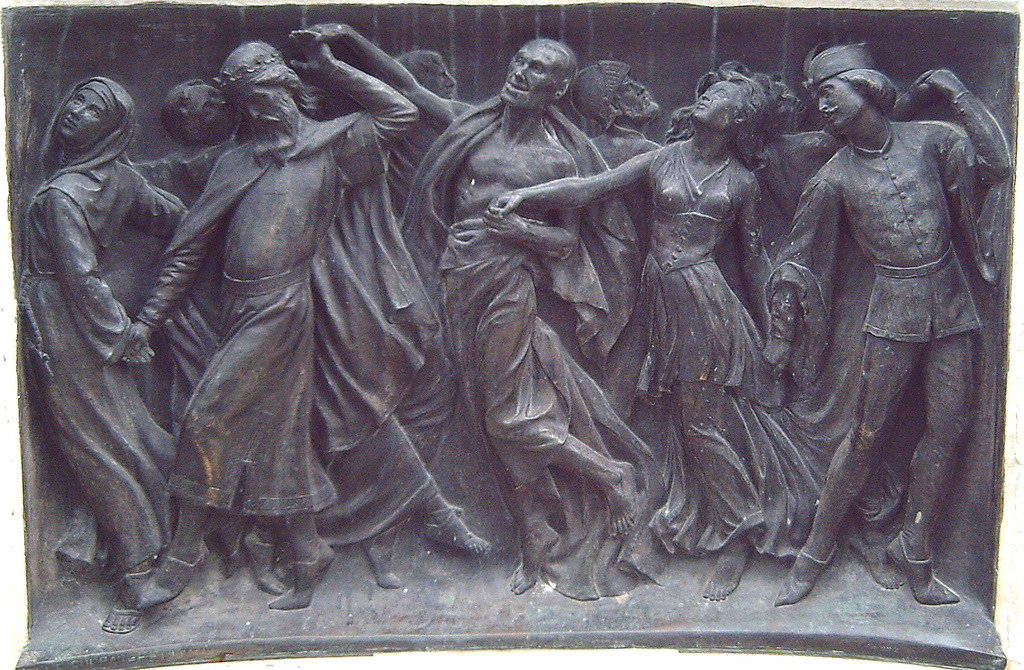
The Dance of Death. Monument to Calderón, Madrid.

- Disappointment: As Renaissance ideals failed and, in the case of Spain, political power continued to ebb, disappointment grew and was manifest in literature which in many cases recalled that of two centuries before, as in the Dance of Death or the Poems on the Death of my Father by Manrique. According to Quevedo, life is formed by "successions of deceased": the new born ones become them, from the diaper to the shroud. In conclusion, nothing temporal has importance, it is necessary only to obtain eternal salvation.
- Preoccupation about the passage of time.
- Loss of confidence in the ideals of the Renaissance.

In view of the crisis of the Baroque, Spanish writers reacted in several ways:

- Escapism: The avoidance of reality, through singing past feats and glories, or through presenting an ideal world in which problems are resolved and order prevails; this is the case of the theater of Lope de Vega and his followers. Others, meanwhile, took refuge in the world of art and mythology, as in the case of Luis de Góngora.
- Satire: Another group of writers chose to make fun of the reality, like Quevedo, Góngora on some occasions, and in the picaresque novel.
- Stoicism: Complaints on the vanity of the world, the fleetingness of beauty, life, and fame. The greatest exponent of this was Calderón de la Barca in the autos sacramentales.
- Moralizing: Criticizing the defects and vices, and proposing models of conduct in line with the political and religious ideology of their time, typified by the narrative and doctrinal prose of Gracián and of Saavedra Fajardo.

== Prose ==
=== Miguel de Cervantes ===
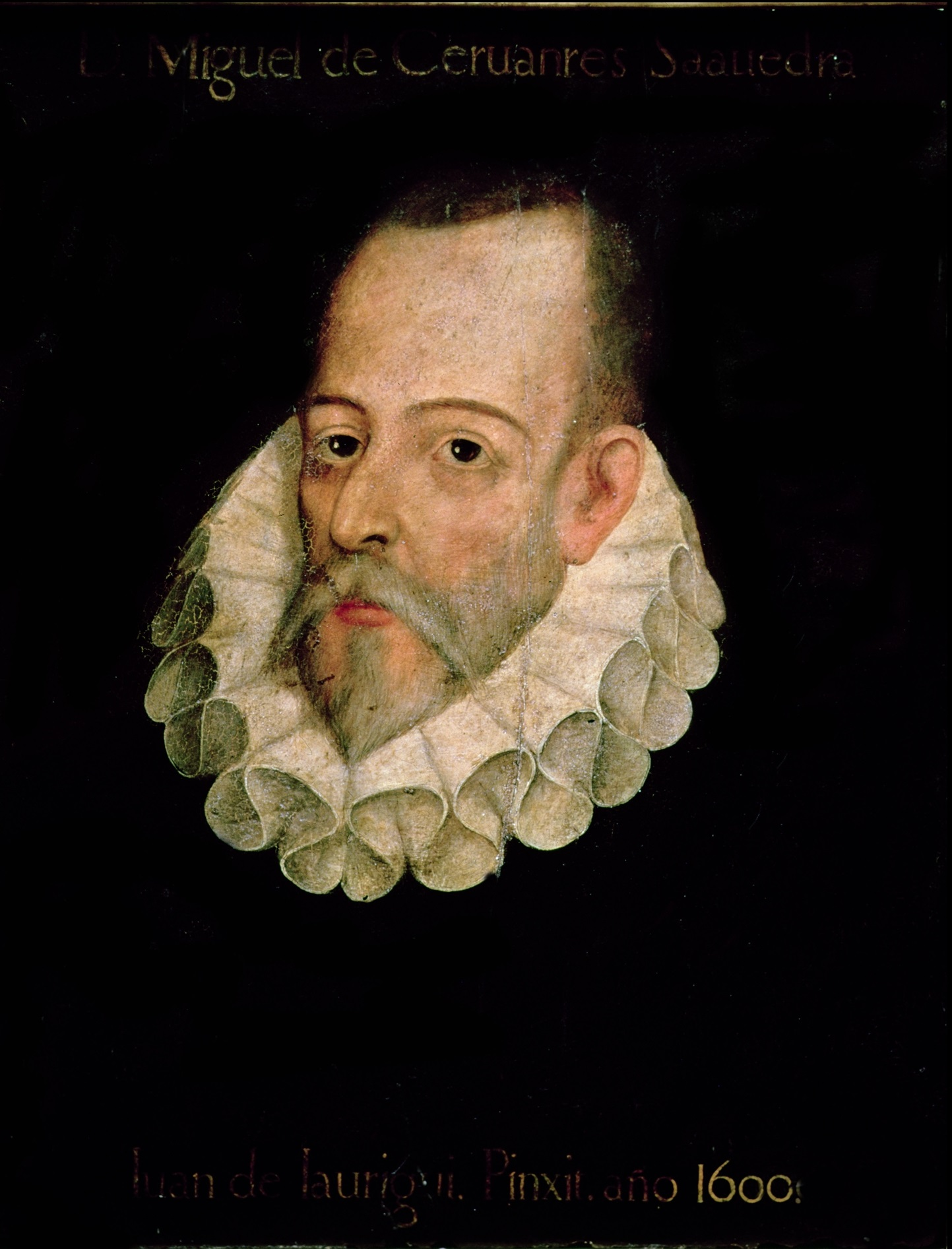
Miguel de Cervantes

The narrative of the 17th century opens with the figure of Miguel de Cervantes, who returned to Spain in 1580 after ten years absence.

His first printed work was The Galatea (1585). It is a pastoral novel (see Spanish Renaissance literature) in six books of verse and prose, according to the model of the Diana of Montemayor; although it breaks with the tradition when introducing realistic elements, like the murder of a shepherd, or the agility of certain dialogues.

In 1605 he published The Ingenious Gentleman Don Quixote of La Mancha, with immediate success.

In 1613 the Exemplary novels appeared. They are a collection of twelve short novels that look for an ideal, although this is not always clear.

In 1615, Cervantes published the second part of Don Quixote.

In 1617, a year after Cervantes died, The Travails of Persiles and Sigismunda appeared. It draws on the Byzantine and Greek novelists such as Heliodorus (3rd century CE) and his The Ethiopian Story of Theagenes and Chariclea. It relates, in four books, how Periandro and Auristela travel from northern territories of Norway or Finland to Rome to receive Christian marriage. As is typical of this subgenre, throughout the trip they experience a variety of trials, mishaps, and delays: captivity by Barbarians, the jealousy and machinations of rivals. The work takes advantage of resources of the Exemplary Novels - especially the italianizing ones - puzzles, confusions, disguises, etc.

=== Francisco de Quevedo ===
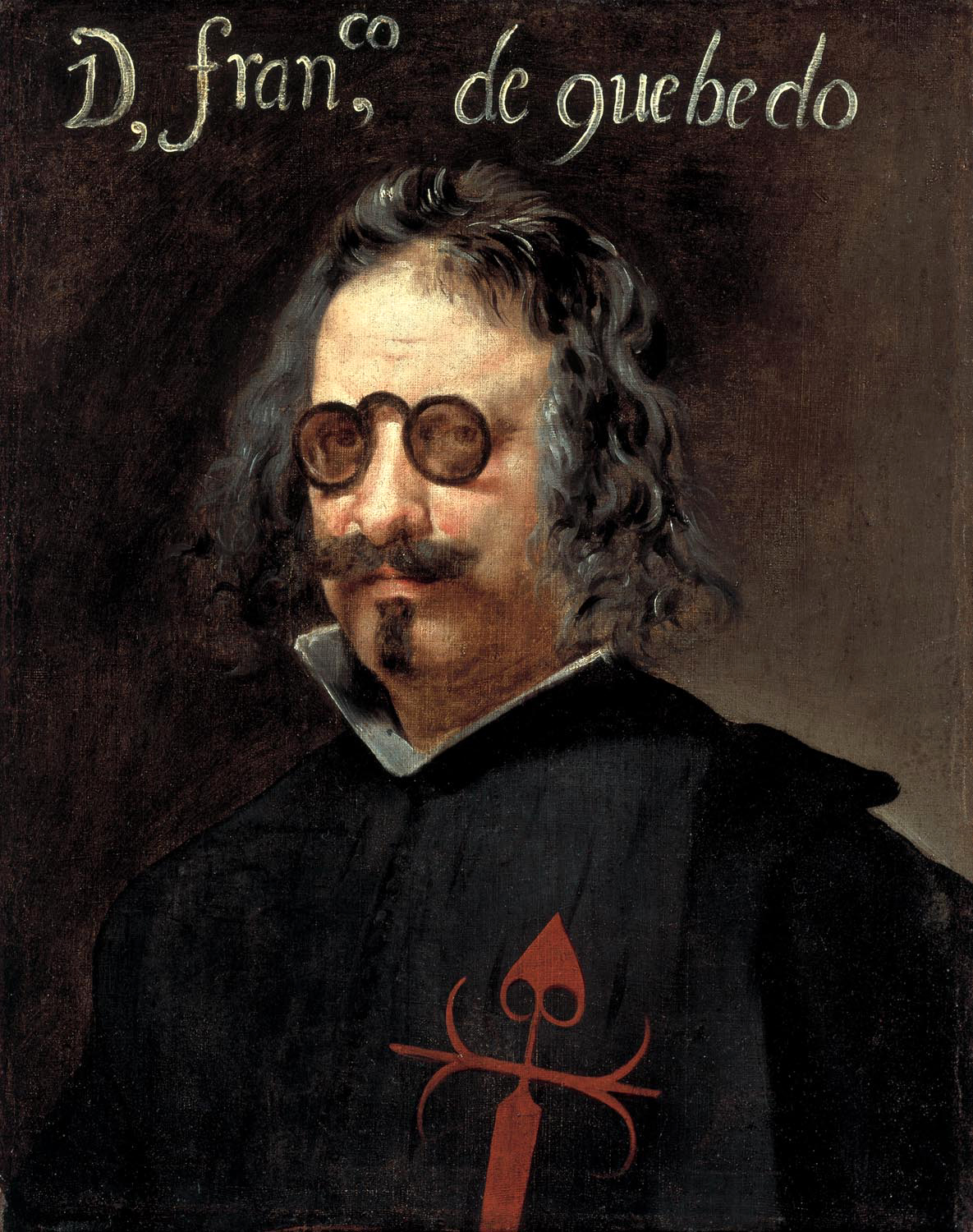
Francisco de Quevedo y Villegas

Francisco de Quevedo wrote towards 1604 his first work of prose fiction : the picaresque novel titled The Life Story of the Sharper called Don Pablos, example of wanderers and mirror of rogues.

Quevedo also wrote satirical, political and moral prose works where a stoic morality predominates, where subjects like the criticism of archetypes of the society of the Baroque, the constant presence of death in the life of man, and Christian fervor whereupon the politics has to conduct itself.

The first of his Dreams dates from 1605: The Dream of the Judgment narrates the resurrection of the dead, who must answer for the manner of their life. It is a social satire against professions or trades: jurists, doctors, butchers...

In 1619 he wrote the Politics of God, government of Christ and tyranny of Satan, a political treatise which expounds a doctrine of good government, or 'mirror of princes', for a righteous king, who should have Jesus Christ for model of conduct. It is a treatise in conformity with Spanish anti-Machiavellism, proposing a politics free of intrigue and unconnected with bad influences.

Towards 1636 Quevedo concluded his last great satirical prose: The hour of everybody and the Fortune with prudence, unpublished until 1650. In it, Jupiter requests Fortune to give for one hour what each individual truly deserves. This makes plain the falsity of appearances, and the hidden truth under the veils of the hypocrisy. Operating by antithesis Quevedo shows doctors who are in fact executioners, the rich as poor but thieving, and a whole gallery of social types, offices and states is presented, all implacably satirized.

Marcus Brutus (1644) arises from glosses or commentaries to the biography that Plutarch wrote on this Latin statesman in his Parallel lives.

=== Baltasar Gracián ===
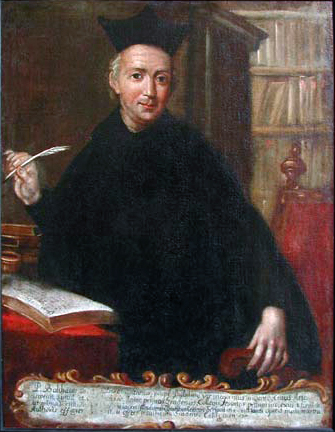
Baltasar Gracián

The most important work of the second half of the century is The Criticon (modeled on The Satyricon) (1651–1657) by the Aragonese Jesuit Baltasar Gracián (1601–1658). With it, the Spanish novel is solved in concepts or abstractions. The idea prevails over the concrete figure. It is a philosophical novel written in form of allegory of the human life.

Gracián cultivated didactic prose in treatises of moral intention and practical purpose, like The Hero (1637), The Politician don Fernando the Catholic (1640) or The Discreet one (1646). In them he creates a full series that exemplifies the exemplary, prudent and sagacious man, and the qualities and virtues that must adorn him.

The Manual oracle and art of prudence is a set of three hundred aphorisms composed to help the reader prevail in the complex world-in-crisis of the 17th century. (An English version of this dense treatise has been sold as a manual of self-help for executives and has obtained a recent publishing success.)

He also wrote a rhetoric of Baroque literature, that starts from the texts to redefine the figures of speech of the time, because they did not relate to the classical models. It is a treaty on the concept, which he defines as "an act of the understanding which expresses the correspondence that is found between the objects". That is to say, a concept is every association between ideas or objects. To their classification and dissection Gracián dedicated his Art of talent, treatise on the witticism (1642), extended and reviewed in the later Witticism and art of talent (1648).

The style of Gracián is dense and polysemous. It is constructed of brief sentences, abundant plays on words, and the ingenious association of concepts.

Gracián's attitude to life is one of disillusionment, based on the decay of Spanish society. The world is seen as a hostile space full of deceit and illusion triumphing over virtue and truth, where Man is a self-interested and malicious being. Many of his books are manuals of behavior that allow the reader to succeed gracefully in spite of the maliciousness of his fellow men. For this, he must be prudent and wise, have knowledge of life and the motivations of others, until the point to behave "to the occasion" and "to play of the" dissimulation.

Gracián is recognized as precursor of existentialism, he also influenced French moralists like La Rochefoucauld, and, in the 19th century, the philosophy of Schopenhauer.

=== Other writers of prose ===
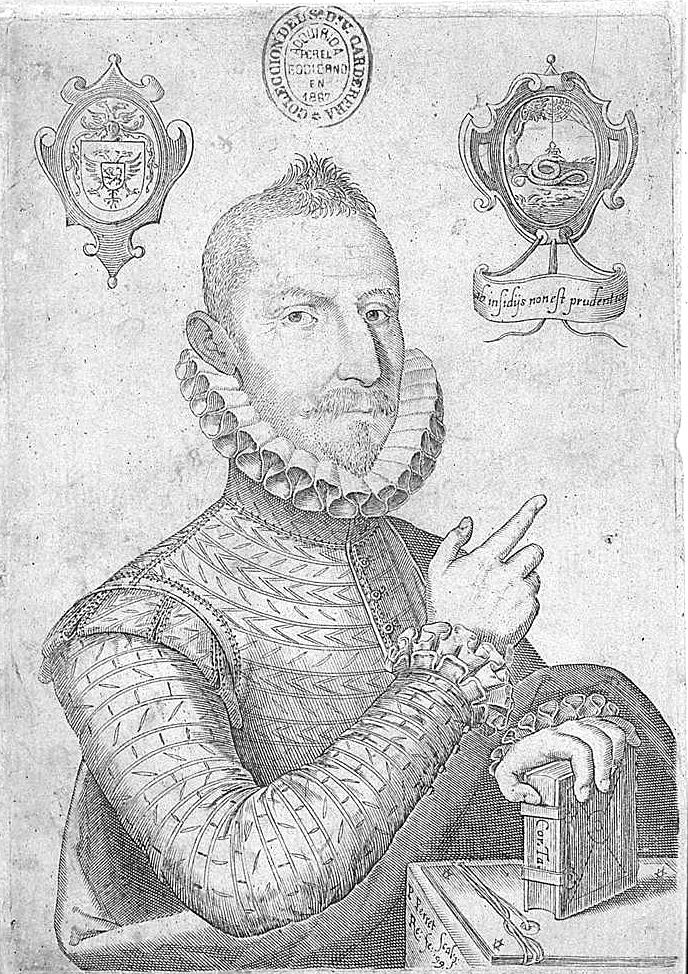
Mateo Alemán by Pedro Perete

- Lope de Vega stands out, whose well-known Novels to Marcia Leonarda can be singled out. They are a collection of miscellaneous novels, brief works, of amorous thematic and intricate technique, in which verse and prose are mixed. Charged with erudition, and subject to frequent and tedious digressions, they are set in exotic atmospheres and peopled with colorful characters. But Lope de Vega is primarily known as one of the greatest of Spanish playwrights, and his plays are written in verse.
- Mateo Alemán (Seville, 1547 - Mexico, 1615) was the author of the picaresque novel Life of the rascal Guzmán de Alfarache, published in 1599. This work established the canon of the genre. It achieved a formidable success in Spain and Europe, and was well known as "the rascal of Alemán". In 1604 the second part of the Guzmán de Alfarache was published in Lisbon. The European success of this work was formidable: it was translated almost immediately into Italian in the Venetian presses of Barezzi in 1606; published in German in Munich in 1615; J. Chapelain translated the two parts of the novel to the French and published them in Paris in 1620; two years later the English version was printed in London by James Mabbe who, in an extraordinary prologue, says of the rascal Guzmán that he was "similar to a ship, that sails on the brink of the shore, and never finishes taking port".
- Alonso de Castillo Solórzano (1584–1648), native of Tordesillas (Valladolid), was a very popular novelist, author of The girl of the lies Teresa de Manzanares (1632), Adventures of the Trapaza Bachelor (1637) and The marten of Seville and hook of the bags (1642). They are picaresque works in which novels, poems and some entremés are mixed, as we have already seen in Lope de Vega.
- Not without reason the Madrilenian María de Zayas y Sotomayor (1590–1661) is considered an important novelist of the century. In 1637 her Loving and exemplary novels appear, a collection of ten stories in which the erotic thematic creates conflicting and surprising situations.
- Luis Vélez de Guevara (1579–1644), Sevillian, a follower of Francisco de Quevedo and author of "The devil cojuelo" (1641), a social satire accompanied by allegorical figures.
- Antonio de Solís y Ribadeneyra (1610–1686), born in Alcala de Henares, was a dramatist and student of law at the University of Salamanca. His plays brought him fame which led to his post as secretary to the Count of Oropesa and later service at the royal courts of Philip IV and Charles II. Eventually appointed official chronicler of the Indies, his work Historia de la Conquista de Mexico (1684) is considered one of the last great works of Golden Age prose and it remained a standard European source on the Americas up through the Enlightenment.
- Juan Ruiz de Alarcón (1581 - 4 August 1639) was a New Spain-born Spanish writer of the Golden Age who cultivated different variants of dramaturgy. Noted for his literary feuds with both Gongora and Lope de Vega.

This half of the century closes with the Life and facts of Estebanillo González, man of good humor (Antwerp, 1646). It narrates his life (1608–1646) as servant of many masters, and soldier in several causes. It displays many characteristic themes of the picaresque genre: swindles, fights, deceits, drunkenness, robberies and prostitution.

Religious prose shines with Miguel de Molinos (1628–1696), originally from Teruel but settled in Rome. His quietist doctrine can be read in Spiritual guide (1675), a manual of contemplative mysticism which despises action.

== Poetry ==
Luis de Góngora and Francisco de Quevedo were the two most important poets. They were enemies and composed many bitter (and funny) satirical pieces attacking each other.

=== Luis de Góngora ===
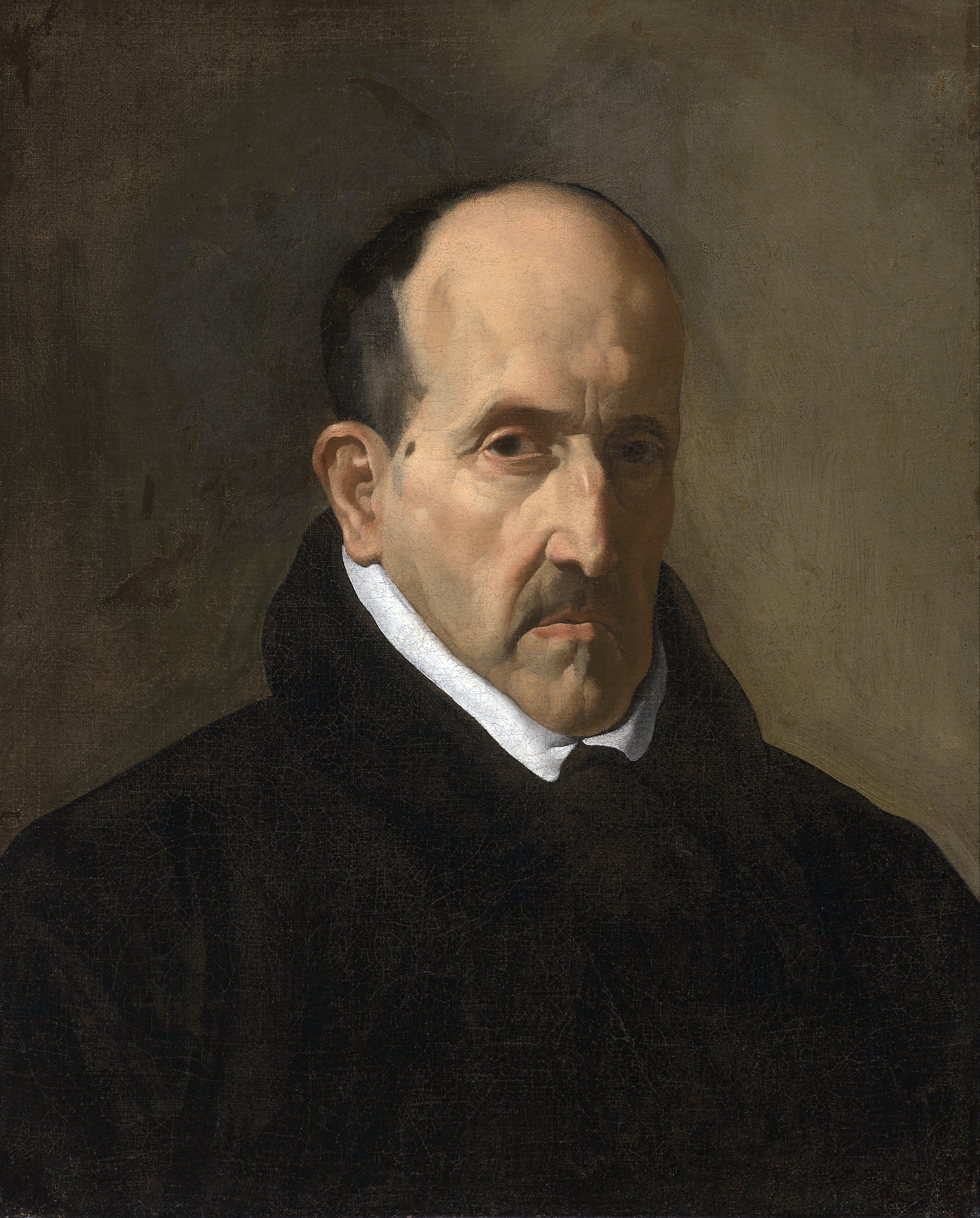
Luis de Góngora by Diego Velázquez.

Góngora's lyric collection consists of numerous sonnets, odes, ballads, songs for guitar, and of certain larger poems, such as the Soledades and the Polifemo, the two landmarks of culteranismo.

Góngora alternates popular poetry with a more cultured one. That way he tries to emulate the style of Ancient Romans and Greeks poets using moreover their mythology. The usage of words that come directly from Latin and its complex syntax make him a difficult author to understand.

=== Francisco de Quevedo ===
Quevedo's poetry first appeared in an anthology by Pedro de Espinosa, Flowers of Illustrious Poets (1605). Quevedo was a master of conceptismo, a movement in opposition to culteranismo.

== The theater ==
Theatrical performances of this time took place in open sites, squares or fixed corrals: the corrals of comedies. They began around two in the afternoon and lasted until dusk. In general they did not have seats, and spectators remained standing throughout the performance. The nobility occupied balconies and windows of houses that surrounded the square or led to the corral, and ladies attended the spectacle with their faces covered with masks or obscured behind lattice windows. The function began with a performance on guitar of a popular piece; immediately, songs accompanied with diverse instruments were sung. The praise came soon, species of explanation of the merits of the work and synthesis of its argument. The main comedy or work then started, and in the intervals dances were executed or entremeses represented.

The stage was a simple platform and the decoration a curtain. The changes of scene were announced by one of the actors.

The poet wrote the comedy, paid by the director, to whom he yielded all the rights on the work, represented or printed, to modify the text. The works lasted three or four days in the billboard, or (with exceptions) fifteen days for a successful comedy.

Juan de la Cueva, in the second half of the 16th century, introduced two elements of great importance for the boom of this artistic production: popular ethics, that gave origin to the comedies of national historical character, and the freedom to compose plays considering popular taste. Lope de Vega and Tirso de Molina took these characteristics to their furthest extent.

=== Lope de Vega ===
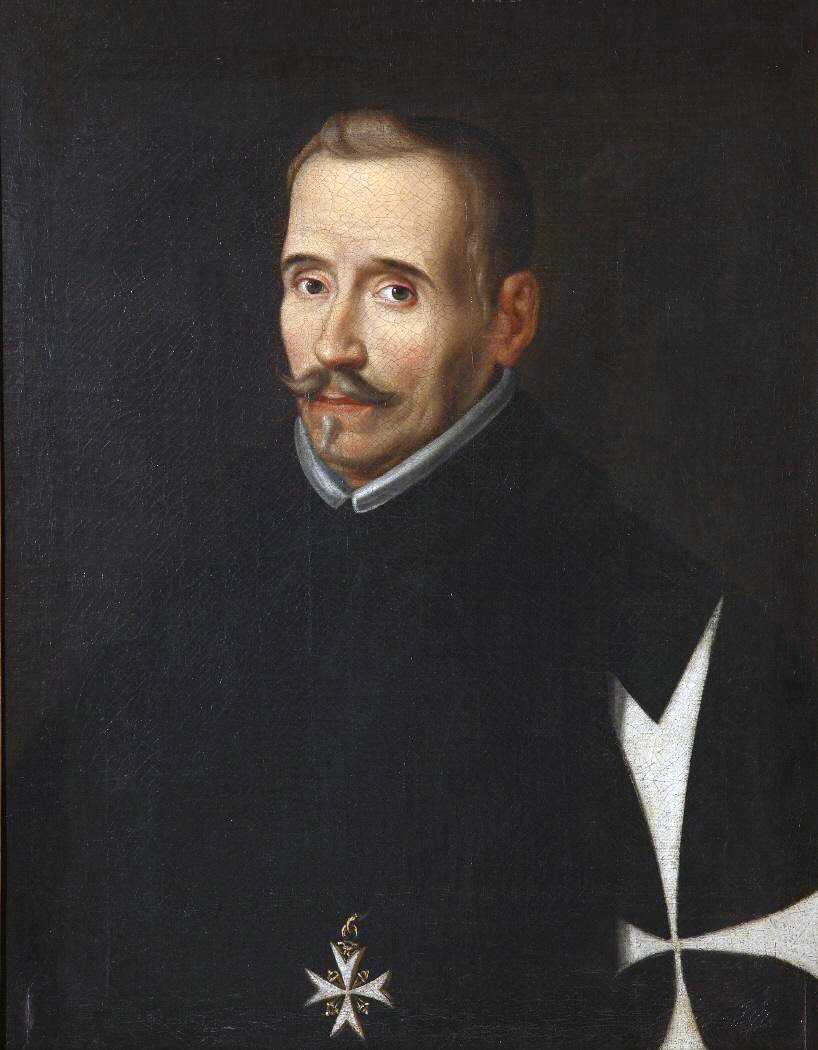
Félix Lope de Vega Carpio

At the end of the 16th century Lope de Vega created the new comedy: to a theme of romantic character is added another theme, historical or legendary, of moriscos, of captives, or religious. It concludes with a happy ending. Constructed on three days, the redondilla or the décima is used in the dialogues, the romance in the narrations, the sonnet in the monologues and the tercet in serious situations.

The new art to make comedies, written in 1609, is a humorous defense of his theater. He shows scorn about the rigid interpretation that the theorists of the Renaissance—mostly Italian—had done of the Aristotelian ideas on the theatre, and he proposes as values, naturalness as opposed to artifice, variety as opposed to unity, and considering popular taste.

Among his prolific dramatic production, some works can be singled out:

Peribáñez and the Commander of Ocaña (1604–12) is a tragicomedy set in 1406 in Toledo: Peribáñez understands that the Commander of Ocaña has overwhelmed him with honors to harass his woman. After killing him he wins the royal pardon.

Around 1614 Lope composed one of his better tragicomedies: Fuenteovejuna. Following the Chronicle of the three orders (Toledo, 1572) of Francisco de Rades, it shows the abuses by the Commander Fernán Gómez de Guzmán of the neighbors of Fuenteovejuna and of Laurencia, newly married with Frondoso. The murder of the Commander by the town and pardon by the Catholic Monarchs in the light of the evidence finishes off the action. A popular revolt triggered by abuse of power is presented, but only concerning a particular injustice, and submission to the king is emphasized.

The Knight of Olmedo (about 1620-25), tragedy rooted in the Celestina, is based on a popular cantar: Don Alonso dies at the hands of Don Rodrigo, jealous at losing Doña Ines.

The Best Mayor, The King is about the dignity of the farmer: Don Tello, haughty nobleman, abuses Elvira, engaged to the farmer Sancho. Alfonso VII allows her to recover her reputation, making her marry Don Tello, and then executes Don Tello, to make the—now noble—widow marry Sancho.

=== Calderón de la Barca ===
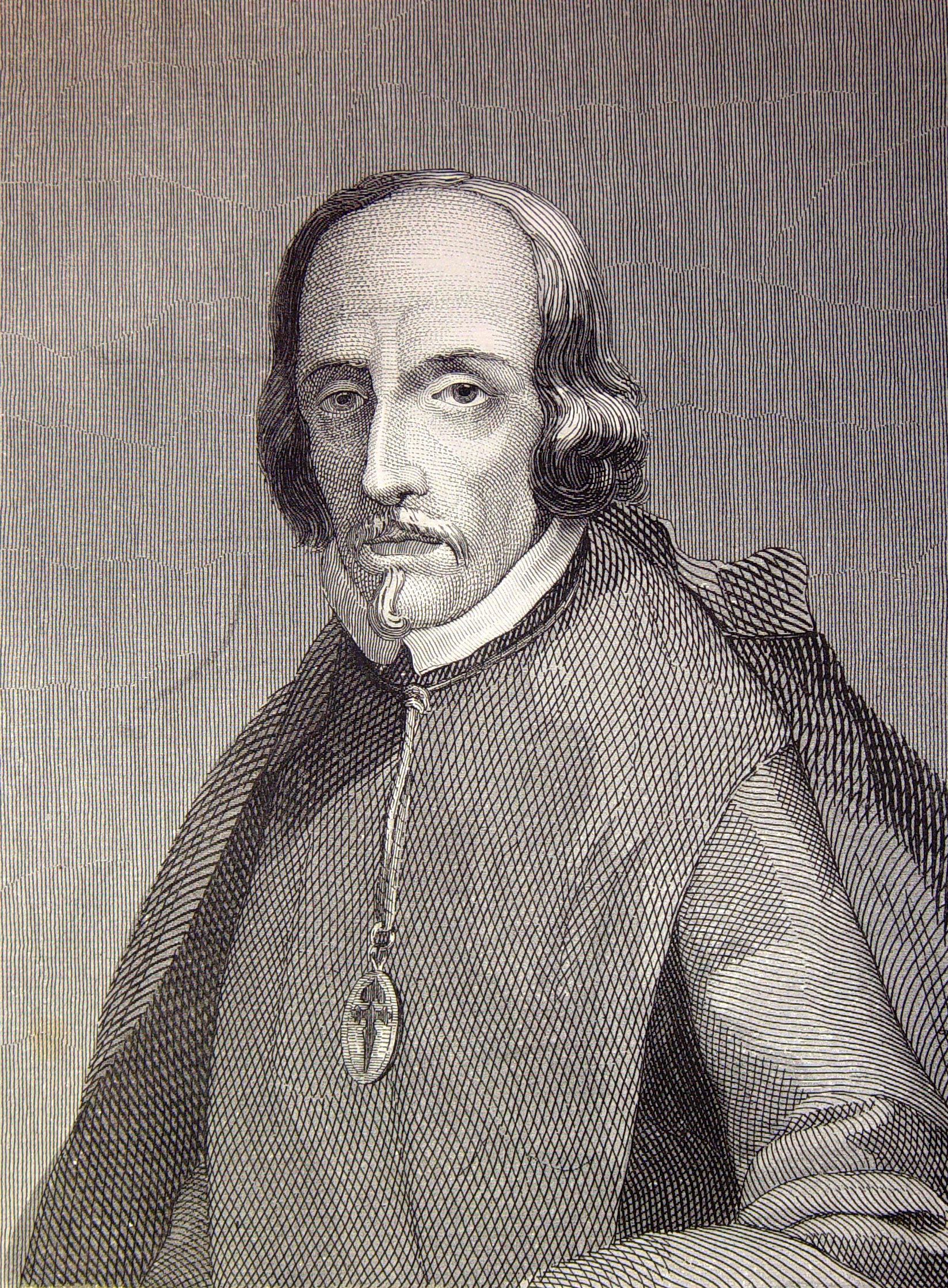
Pedro Calderón de la Barca

The other great dramatist of the 17th century was Pedro Calderón de la Barca (1600–1681). His most famous work is Life is a dream (1635), a philosophical drama in which Segismundo, son of the king of Poland, is chained in a tower because of the fateful predictions of the royal astrologers that he will kill his father. Meanwhile, Rosaura proclaims in the Court that her honor has been violated by Duke Astolfo. Duke Astolfo courts Estrella in order to become king. The aggressiveness of Segismundo explodes when he is released from his tower, where he returns, chained, believing he has dreamed his experience of freedom. When a riot rescues him again, his will overcomes the predictions: he overcomes his violent nature, marries Rosaura to Astolfo, and accepts the hand of Estrella.

El alcalde de Zalamea may have been first staged in 1636 or 37. It was printed in 1651. First translated into English as The Garrotte Better Given, from 1683 on the title was more accurately rendered as The Mayor of Zalamea. It presents the story of the rape of Isabel, daughter of Pedro Crespo, by the captain Alvaro de Ataide. Pedro Crespo being named mayor, he kills de Ataide. The king listens to his defense and Crespo presents his reasons. He is then pardoned by the King. This customary drama of honor deals with Lope's similar theme of the honor of a peasant.

== Bibliography ==
- Introducción al Barroco, E. Orozco, ed. José Larra Garrido, Universidad de Granada, 2 vols, 1988.
- La poesía en la Edad de Oro. Barroco, Pilar Palomo, ed. Taurus, Madrid, 1987.
- El teatro en España (1490-1700), Melveena McKendrick, ed. Oro Viejo, Barcelona, 1994.
- Manierismo y Barroco, E. Orozco, ed. Cátedra, Madrid, 1981.
- Notas sobre el Barroco, E. Tierno Galván, Escritos (1950–1960), Tecnos, Madrid, 1971.
- Traditions populaires et diffusion de la culture en Espagne (XVIe-XVIIe siècles), PUB, Bourdeaux, 1981.
- "El Barroco español" (1943-44), Estilo y estructura en la literatura española, L. Spitzer, Crítica, Barcelona, 1980.
- El Pinciano y las teorías literarias del Siglo de Oro, S. Shepard, Gredos, Madrid, 1970.
- Hacia el concepto de la sátira en el siglo XVII, A. Pérez Lasheras, Universidad de Zaragoza, 1995.
- El prólogo en el Manierismo y Barroco españoles, A. Porqueras Mayo, CSIC, Madrid, 1968.
- La teoría poética en el Manierismo y Barroco españoles, A. Porqueras Mayo, Puvill, Barcelona, 1989.
- La prosa didáctica en el siglo XVII, Asunción Rallo, Taurus, Madrid, 1988.

== See also ==
- Baroque: the movement in general.
- Literature of Spain: history of Spanish literature.
- Spanish Golden Age: in Spain.
