= Alonso Martínez =

Alonso Martínez may refer to:

- Alonso Martínez (footballer), Costa Rican footballer
- Alonso Martínez (Madrid Metro), a station of the Madrid Metro
- Alonso Martínez de Espinar, Spanish courtier
