= Prince Baltasar Carlos in the Riding School =

Painting by Diego Velázquez

- Lección de equitación del príncipe Baltasar Carlos (Spanish)
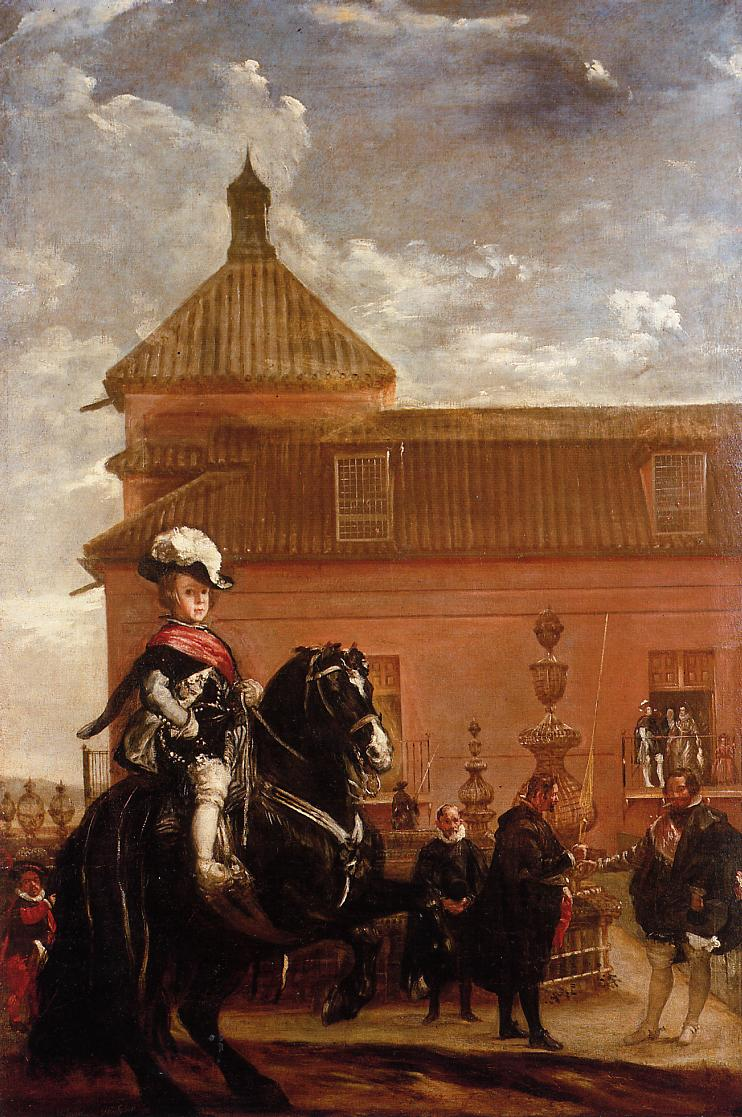
- Artist: Diego Velázquez
- Year: circa 1636
- Medium: Oil on canvas
- Dimensions: 144.2 cm × 97 cm (56.8 in × 38 in)
- Location: National Gallery; London
- Owner: Grosvenor Estate

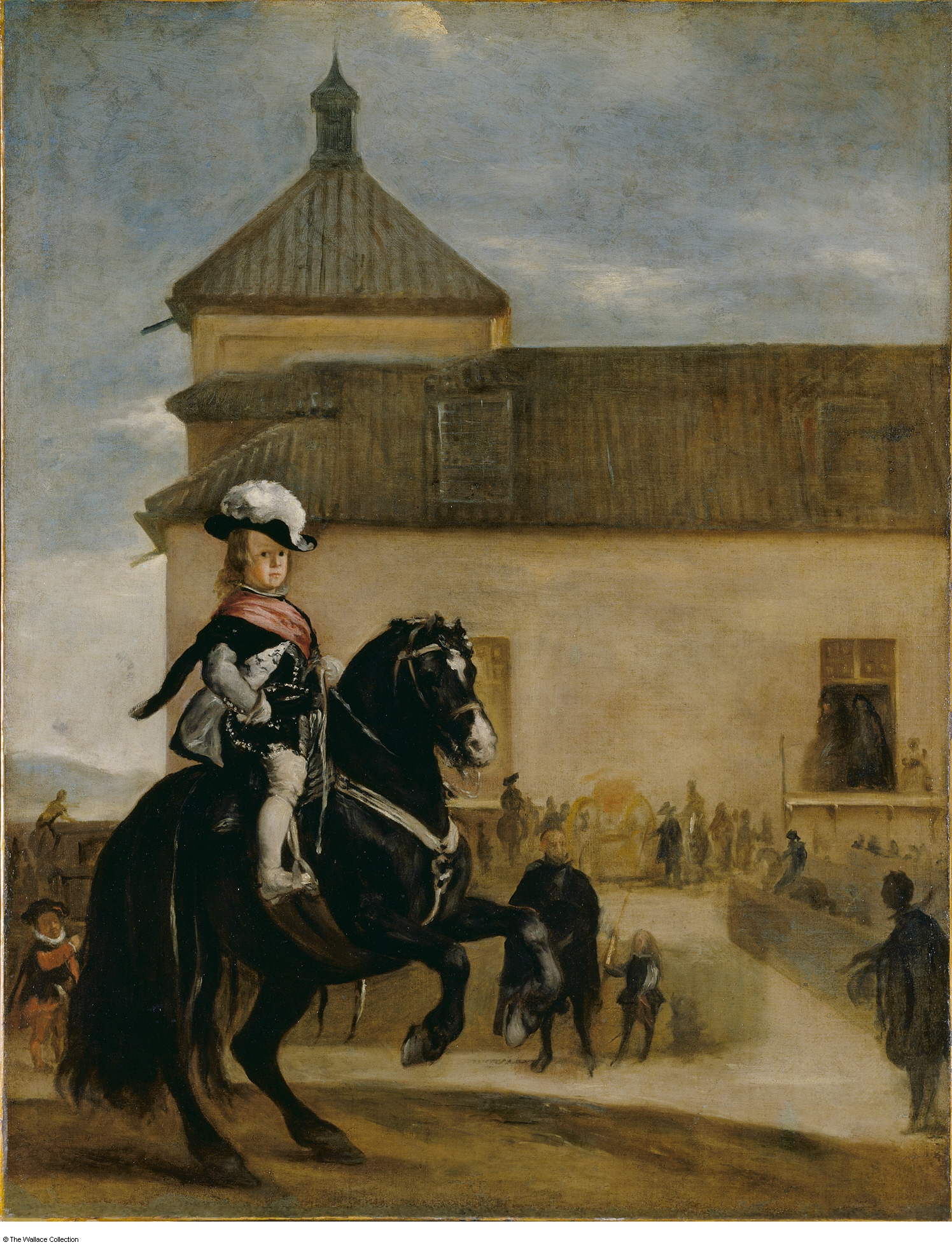
Another version of the painting, in the Wallace Collection, in London

Prince Baltasar Carlos in the Riding School, Spanish: La lección de equitación del príncipe Baltasar Carlos, is a painting by Diego Velázquez, painted at the Palacio del Buen Retiro outside Madrid, probably in 1636. There are two versions of the painting, one on loan to the National Gallery in London, the other in the Wallace Collection in the same city; the latter is sometimes attributed to the studio of Velázquez, sometimes to Velázquez himself.

== History ==
The original version of the work was loaned to the National Gallery in London in 2007–2008.

The first documented mention of the later version is in a letter written in 1828 from Madrid by the Scottish artist David Wilkie, who described it as a "duplicate" of the painting in the possession of Robert Grosvenor, 2nd Earl Grosvenor. In 1856 it was bought by Richard Seymour-Conway, 4th Marquess of Hertford, at a sale of the effects of the poet Samuel Rogers, and so passed into the Wallace Collection.

== The paintings ==
Both versions of the painting show the Infante Baltasar Carlos, at the age of about seven, on horseback in front of the Palacio del Buen Retiro outside Madrid; behind him is a dwarf. The horse is performing a levade, one of the "airs above the ground" of the haute école of classical dressage.

In middle ground of the original version, Gaspar de Guzmán, Count-Duke of Olivares, first minister to the King and riding-master to the prince, receives a lance – which he will then hand to his charge – from Alonso Martínez de Espinar, identified from an engraving, by Juan de Noort, on the frontispiece of his treatise on archery; they are watched by Juan Mateos, identified from an engraving by Pedro Perete on the title page of his treatise on hunting. Behind them, on a balcony of the palace, stand King Philip IV and Queen Isabel.

== See also ==
- List of works by Diego Velázquez
