= Alonso Martínez de Espinar =

Spanish courtier and writer

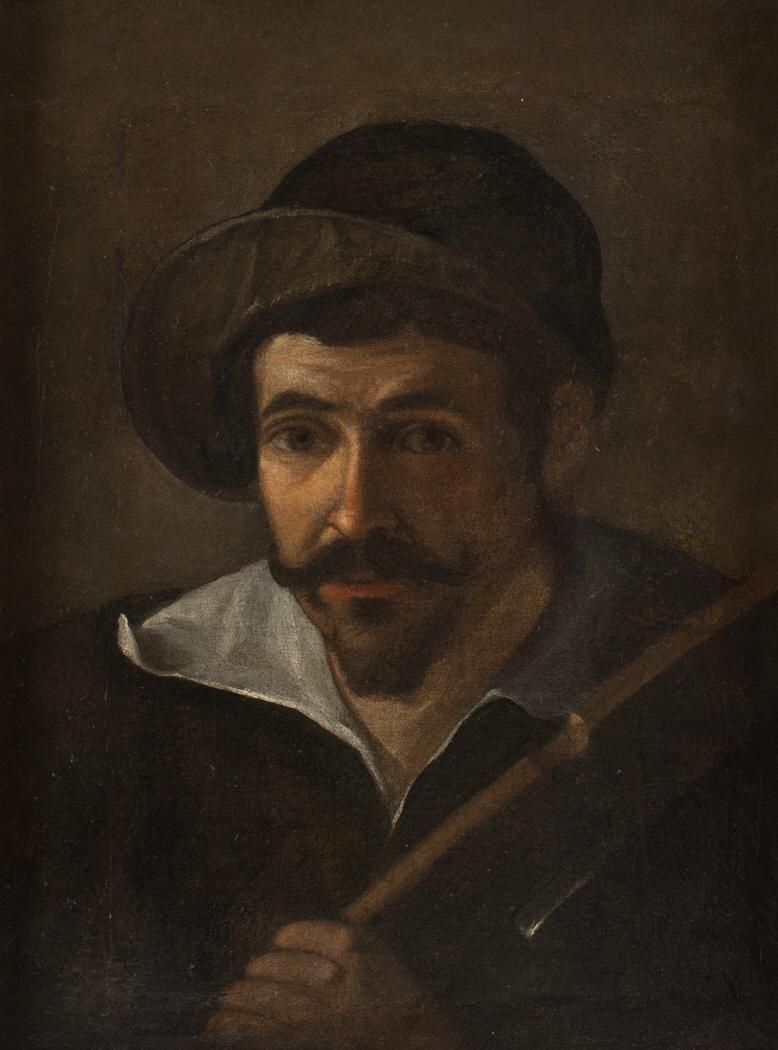
- Anonymous portrait in the Museo del Greco, Toledo
- Born: 5 May 1588
- Died: 14 May 1682 (aged 94); Madrid
- Occupations: Ballestero real; Royal arquebusier
- Notable work: Arte de ballestería y montería, 1644
- Spouses: Francisca de Rojas; Juliana Romano
- Parents: Cristóbal Martínez de Espinar (father); Juana Hernández Sacristán (mother)

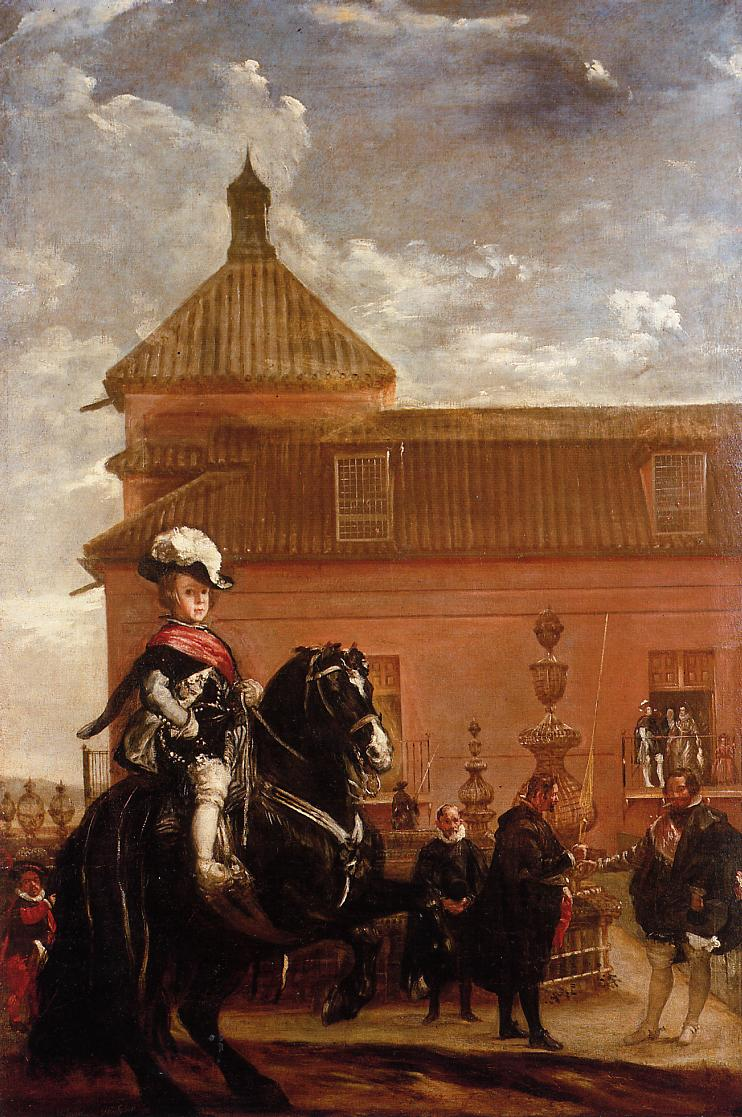
Diego Velázquez, Lección de equitación del príncipe Baltasar Carlos, 1636; Martínez de Espinar is handing a lance to Gaspar de Guzmán, Count-Duke of Olivares, riding-master to Prince Balthasar Charles

Alonso Martínez de Espinar (5 May 1588 – 14 May 1682) was a Spanish courtier and one of three important writers on venery of the Spanish Baroque. He was a ballestero ("crossbowman") and arquebusier to several kings of Spain.

== Life ==
Martínez de Espinar was the son of Cristóbal Martínez de Espinar, of Baza in Granada, and Juana Hernández Sacristán, who was from Brunete in the province of Madrid. He was baptised in the church of San Martín in Madrid. He had a sister, Jerónima Martínez de Espinar, who married Alonso Mateos, who was ballestero to the King of Spain and the brother of Juan Mateos, author of another important book on venery.

== Pictorial representations ==
Martínez de Espinar appears in the original version of Prince Baltasar Carlos in the Riding School painted by Diego Velázquez at the Palacio del Buen Retiro in 1636. He is shown in the right middle ground of the picture, handing a lance to Gaspar de Guzmán, Count-Duke of Olivares, riding-master to Prince Baltasar Carlos, who will then hand it to his charge, who is on horseback in the foreground; behind Martínez de Espinar is Juan Mateos, while on a balcony of the palace stand King Philip IV and Queen Isabel.

Three portraits are known or believed to be of Martínez de Espinar: the frontispiece of his book Arte de ballestería y montería, an engraving by Juan de Noort, also known as Johannes van Noordt III; an anonymous painting of the school of Velázquez in the Museo del Prado in Madrid, thought to be of him; and another anonymous portrait in the Museo del Greco in Toledo.

== Published work ==
The Arte de ballestería y montería is one of the three principal works on venery of the Spanish Baroque period. (Note: The others are the Origen y dignidad de la caça by Juan Mateos, 1634; and the unpublished manuscript Libro de Montería by Pedro de Pedraza Gaitán.) It was published in Madrid in 1644, with a preface by Francisco de Quevedo Villegas. It is dedicated to Balthasar Charles, Prince of Asturias, and contains portrait engravings of him and of Martínez de Espinar by Juan de Noort; the other engravings, of hunting scenes, are by an unknown hand.

The book is in three parts, and – despite the title, which means roughly "the art of crossbowmanship and hunting" – deals with hunting both with the crossbow and with the arquebus; it also covers hunting with lures and traps.

A second edition was published in 1739 in Naples, which at that time was under Spanish rule; another was published by Antonio Marín in Madrid in 1761.

== Gallery ==
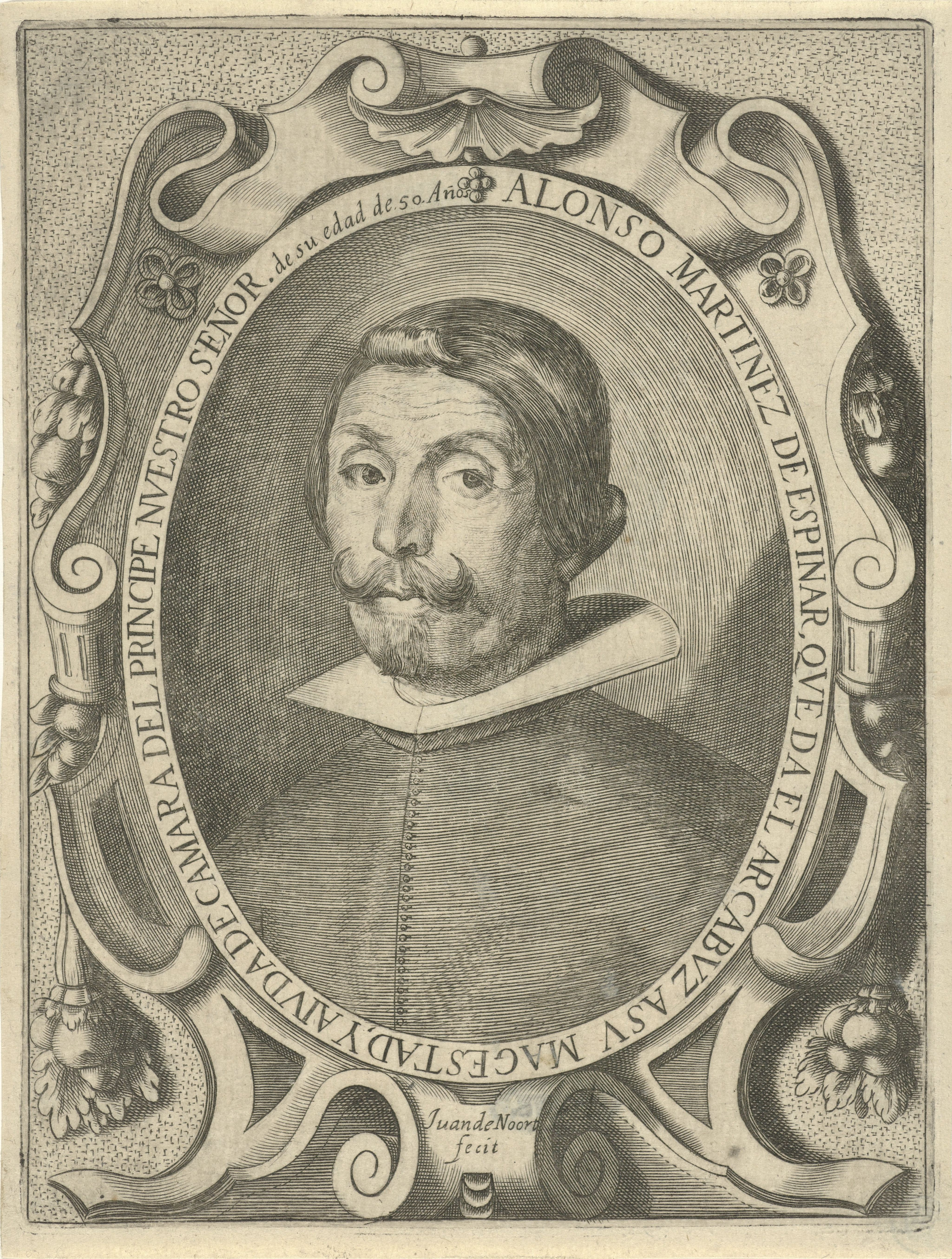
Engraving by Juan van Noort from the Arte de ballesteria y monteria, 1644

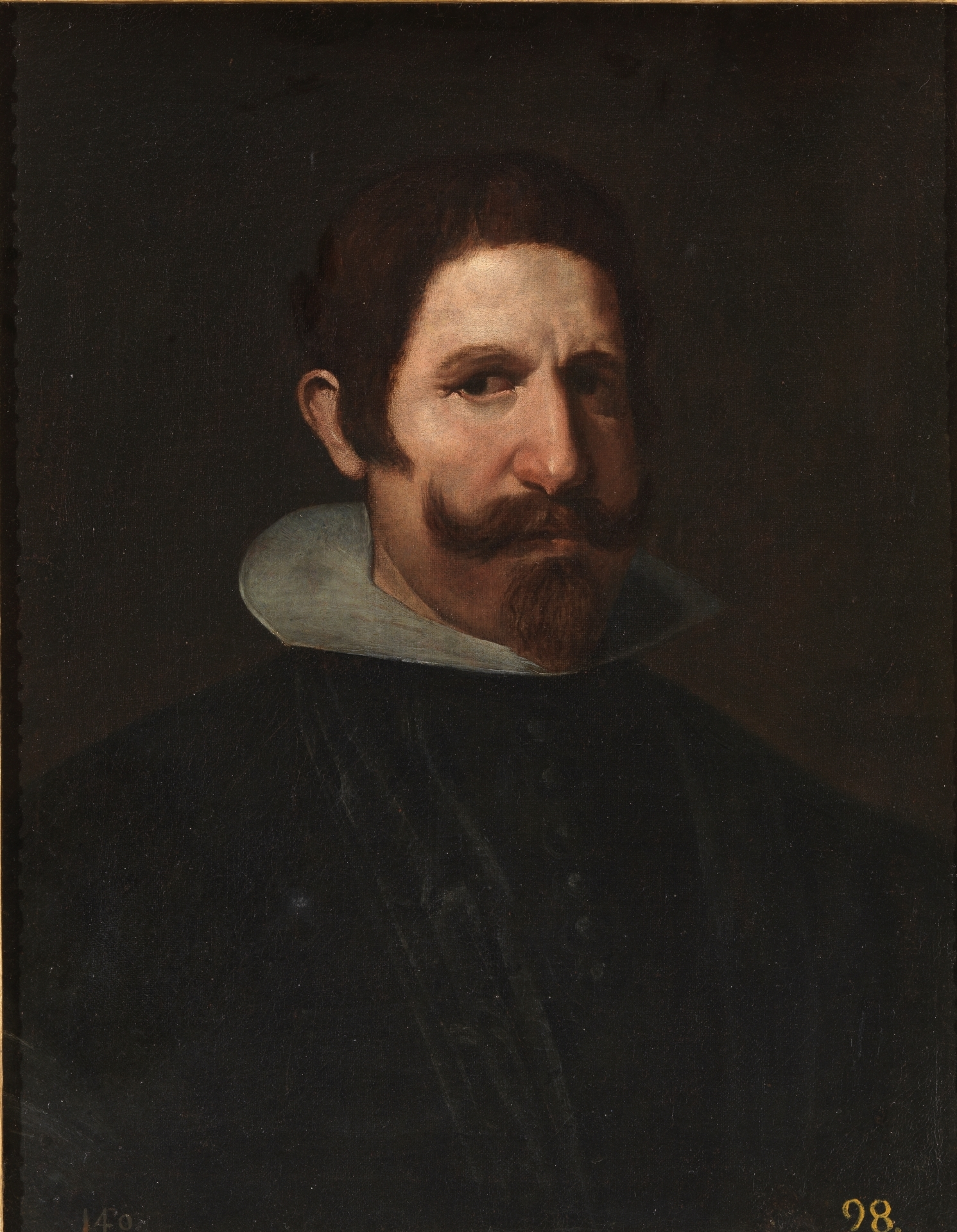
Anonymous portrait, school of Velásquez, Museo del Prado, Madrid
