= Don Juan Mateos =

(c. 1632–33) painting by Diego Velázquez

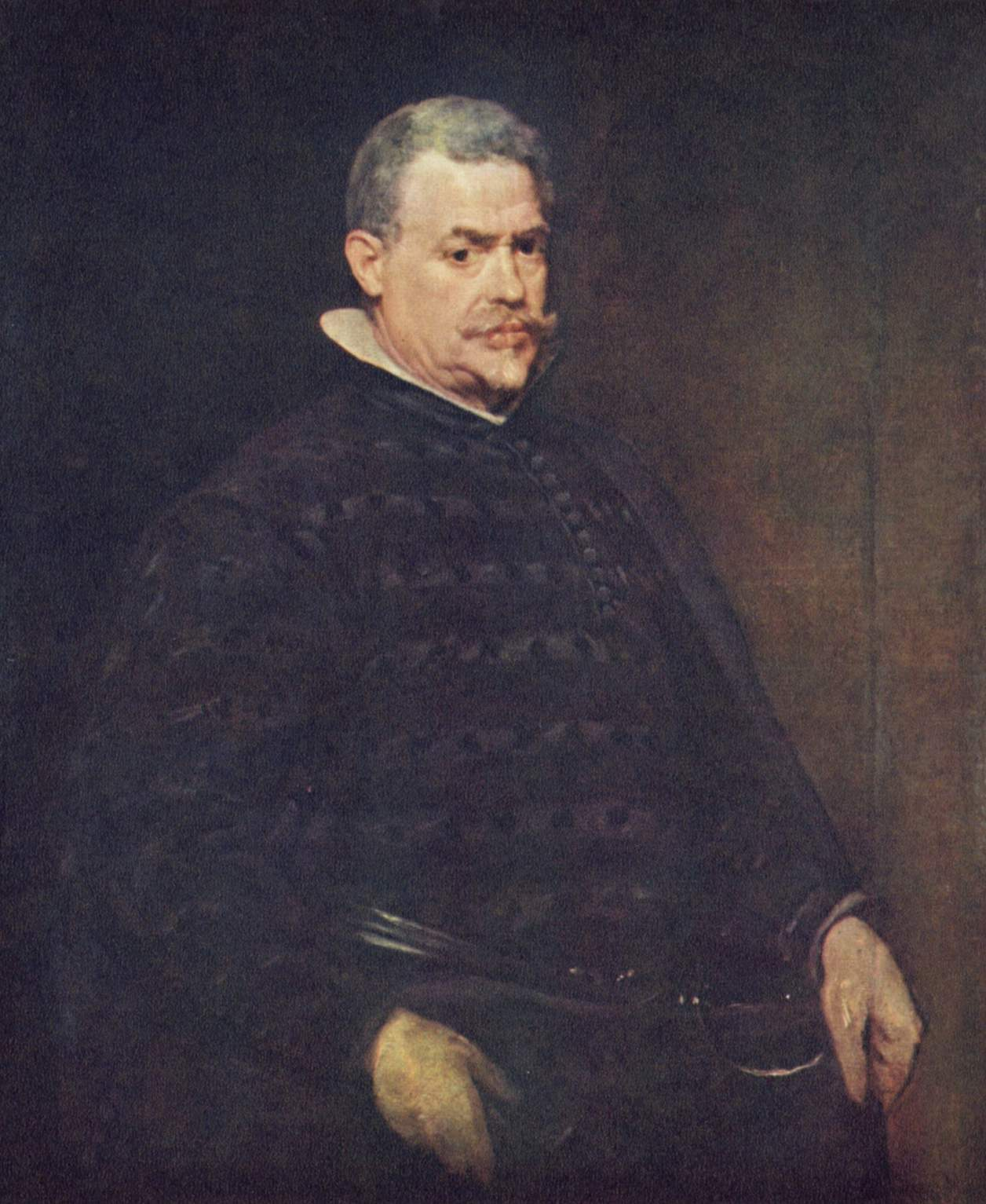
- Artist: Diego Velázquez
- Year: circa 1632–33
- Medium: Oil on canvas
- Dimensions: 109 cm × 90.5 cm (43 in × 35.6 in)
- Location: Gemäldegalerie Alte Meister; Dresden

Don Juan Mateos is an oil on canvas painting widely attributed to Diego Velázquez created circa 1632–33.

== Background ==
This work is widely attributed to Diego Velázquez and has been dated to 1632 or 1633. The portrait is referenced in 1685 among the assets of Cesare Ignazio of Modena as "ritratto di Monsu Velasco [...] quale figura que ha le mani solo abbozzate" or "portrait of Signor Velasco ... hands but roughly sketched". Sold as the work of Rubens in 1746 to Augustus III of Poland, it passed from his collection into the Gemäldegalerie Alte Meister in Dresden, where for some time it was considered the work of Titian.

The portrait, cut below the waist, wears black with golden highlights and a white collar. The hands, only outlined, rest the right on the hilt of a pistol the left on the sword. The figure is cut out on a reddish-gray background, brighter in front of the figure. The head, intensely illuminated and slightly turned, looks at the viewer with a penetrating gaze. Signs of ageing include the wrinkles on his nose and his neck.

The model is believed to be Juan Mateos, Philip IV's horseman and main crossbowman. Art historian Carl Justi compared the Velázquez portrait with the small portrait of the author and hunter engraved by Pedro Perete that appears on the front of his work, Origen y dignidad de la caza (Origin and Dignity of Hunting). Jonathan Brown suggests that the portrait could have been acquired on the death of Mateos by Ippolito Camillo Guidi, ambassador of the Duke of Modena in Madrid from 1641 to 1643, commissioned by the Duke, after a visit to the Madrid court, to purchase works of art to hedge against the constant devaluation of the billon currency used in his remuneration. The inventory of the goods left at his death by Mateos included, in fact, together with a small number of religious paintings, two portraits, one his and another of his wife, María Marquart, now deceased, but they were cited as full-length portraits and were jointly valued at just 100 reales, with no indication of the painter's name.

== See also ==
- List of works by Diego Velázquez

== Bibliography ==
- Barrio Moya, José Luis (1998). Aportaciones a la biografía de Juan Mateos, ballestero mayor de Felipe IV, retratado por Velázquez (in Spanish). Asociación Cultural.
- Brown, Jonathan (1986). Velázquez. Pintor y cortesano (in Spanish). Madrid: Alianza Editorial. ISBN 84-206-9031-7.
- Gallego, Antonio (1999). Historia del grabado en España (in Spanish). Ediciones Cátedra. ISBN 84-376-0209-2.
- López-Rey, José (2014). Velázquez. Obra completa (in Spanish). Colonia: Taschen Wildenstein Institute. ISBN 978-3-8365-5014-7.
- Morán Turina, Miguel; Sánchez Quevedo, Isabel (1999). Velázquez. Catálogo completo (in Spanish). Madrid: Ediciones Akal SA. ISBN 84-460-1349-5.
- Salort Pons, Salvador (2002). Velázquez en Italia (in Spanish). Madrid: Fundación de Apoyo a la Historia del Arte Hispánico. ISBN 84-932891-1-6.
