= Pedro Perete =

Spanish painter (c.1610–1639)

- Born: c. 1610; Madrid
- Died: 8 April 1639 (aged 28–29); Madrid
- Other name: Spanish: Pedro Perret
- Occupation: Engraver
- Father: Peter Perret

Pedro Perete, (c. 1610 – 8 April 1639) was a seventeenth-century Baroque engraver and painter in Madrid. He was the son, and pupil, of engraver Peter Perret. Perete Hispanicized the family name from the Dutch "Perret". Many of his works have been attributed to or confused with those by his father. (Note: Zarco del Valle, published Perete's death certificate, believing it to be the father's. He also assigned the son's works to the father; the confusion of identities was carried on by Barrio Moya in 1982, and even at later dates the error was found repeated.)

== Background ==
The son of Peter Perret and Isabel de Faria, it is believed he was born in Madrid in 1610, where his father was working for Philip III. In 1622, the elder Perret received from Philip IV a grant of 200 ducats "con cargo de enseñar su arte con toda perfección a un hijo suyo que ha empezado a aprenderla" ("with the charge of teaching his art with all perfection to a son of his who has begun to learn it"). His father's death in 1625 left the family impoverished as Perete and his sister Josefa had to ask the king for assistance.

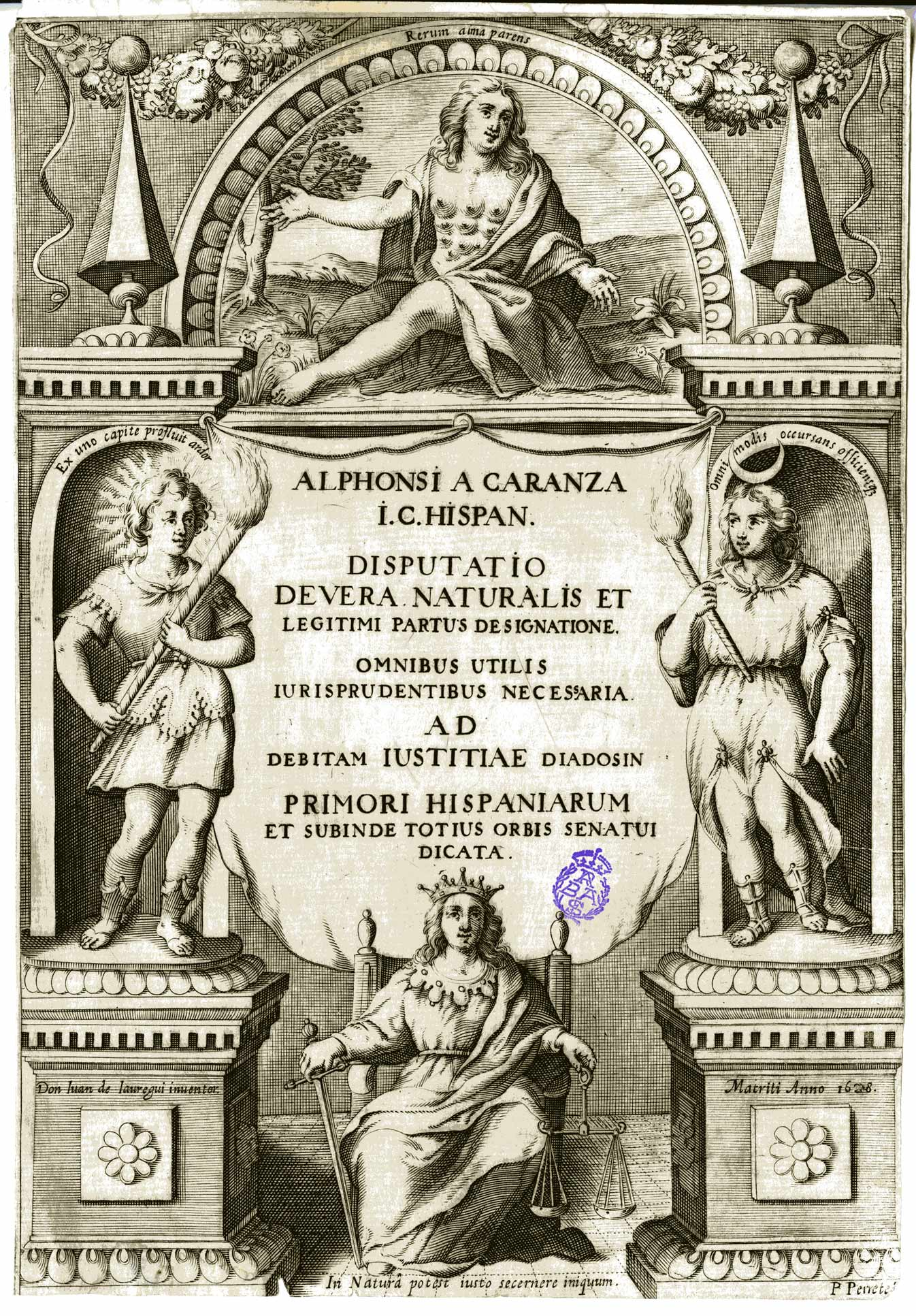
Cover of DISPUTATIO DE VERA NATURALIS ET LEGITIMI PARTUS DESIGNATIONE... ALPHONSI A CARANZA / Don Iuan de Iauregui inventor Matriti Anno 1628

His earliest known works date from 1628, the allegory of the portraits of Philip I, Charles V, and Philip II drawn by Cornelius de Beer, and the cover and front page of Alfonso Carranza's, Disputatio de vera naturalis et legitimi partus designatione (Discussion on the True Designation of Natural and Legitimate Offspring), with the portrait of the author and allegorical verses by Juan de Jáuregui. His best-known work, which he signed as an engraver, are the illustrations of Origen y dignidad de la caça (Origin and Dignity of Hunting) by Juan Mateos, printed in Madrid in 1634, with the portrait of the author on the cover. Based on that engraving, art historian Carl Justi identified Mateos as the model of an unfinished portrait of a gentleman cut below the waist painted by Velázquez, Don Juan Mateos. Other works include an equestrian portrait of the Count-Duke of Olivares and an interior illustration representing a "cloth of wild boar", executed by means of a drawing by Francisco Collantes; prints dedicated to religious life included in the work of Juan de Palma, "Vida de la sereníssima infanta sor Margarita de la Cruz, religiosa descalza de Sta. Clara" (Life of the most serene Infanta Sister Margarita de la Cruz, barefoot nun of Sta. Clara), printed in Madrid, 1636, in the Royal Printing Office, with a front cover print representing the nun, accompanied by allegories of Pobreza and Oración, and a portrait of Philip IV, inspired by one of Velázquez's portraits of the monarch.

In his later years he reverse-engraved the portrait of Count-Duke of Olivares originally made by Rubens and engraved by Paulus Pontius, engraved eighteen busts of the heroes published in the Ilustración del renombre de Grande by Juan Antonio de Tapia y Robles, printed in Madrid in 1638, and engraved a portrait of the Count-Duke of Olivares made by Herman Panneels.

Of his work as a painter, only two canvases are known to exist. The first is a portrayal of the parable of the rich man and Lazarus (Spanish: Lázaro y el rico Epulón) and the Raising of Lazarus (Spanish: Resurrección de Lázaro), the first signed by P. Peret, in the sotacoro or "area below the choir" of the Church of the Saviour in Herrín de Campos.

He died in Madrid on 8 April 1639, on Calle del Príncipe, and was buried in the parish of St Sebastian's Church in Madrid. His successor as the king's engraver was his pupil, Pedro de Villafranca.

== Bibliography ==
- Barrio Moya, José Luis (1998). Aportaciones a la biografía de Juan Mateos, ballestero mayor de Felipe IV, retratado por Velázquez. Asociación Cultural. pp. 107–122.
- Barrio Moya, José Luis (1982). Pedro de Villafranca y Malagón, pintor y grabador manchego del siglo XVII. Vol. 13. pp. 107–122.
- Ceán Bermúdez, Juan Agustín (1800). Diccionario histórico de los más ilustres profesores de la Bellas Artes en España (in Spanish). Vol. IV. Madrid. pp. 87–93. Archived from the original on 9 March 2016.
- Gallego, Antonio (1999). Historia del grabado en España (in Spanish). Ediciones Cátedra. ISBN 84-376-0209-2.
- López Rey, José [in Spanish] (2014). Velázquez. Obra completa (in Spanish). Colonia, Taschen. ISBN 978-3-8365-5014-7.
- Zarco del Valle-Conde las Navas (Espinosa Quesada), "Pedro Perret (1555-1639)" (in Spanish). Vol. I. Madrid. 1899. pp. 582–587.
