= Pieter Perret =

Flemish engraver (c.1555–1625)

- Born: c. 1555; Antwerp
- Died: 1625 (aged 69–70); Madrid
- Other name: Spanish: Pedro Perret
- Occupation: Engraver

Pieter Perret or Peter Perret (Spanish: Pedro Perret c. 1555–1625) was a Flemish engraver. After training in Antwerp and Rome, he worked in Madrid in the service of Philip II of Spain. He introduced into Spain the Flemish printmaking tradition and the new artistic style that was developing among Northern artists under the influence of contemporary Italian art. He is credited with renewing Spanish printmaking. He was known for his large-scale architectural prints, frontispieces, portraits and reproductions of contemporary artworks.

== Background ==
Born in Antwerp around 1555, he was a pupil of Maerten de Vos and Gerard de Jode. Prior to 1578 he studied engraving in Rome with Cornelis Cort. After that, he returned to Antwerp, eventually moving to Bavaria, where he was appointed engraver to William IV, Duke of Bavaria and the Elector of Cologne. During this time, he may also have worked in Paris for publisher Nicolas Le Bon.

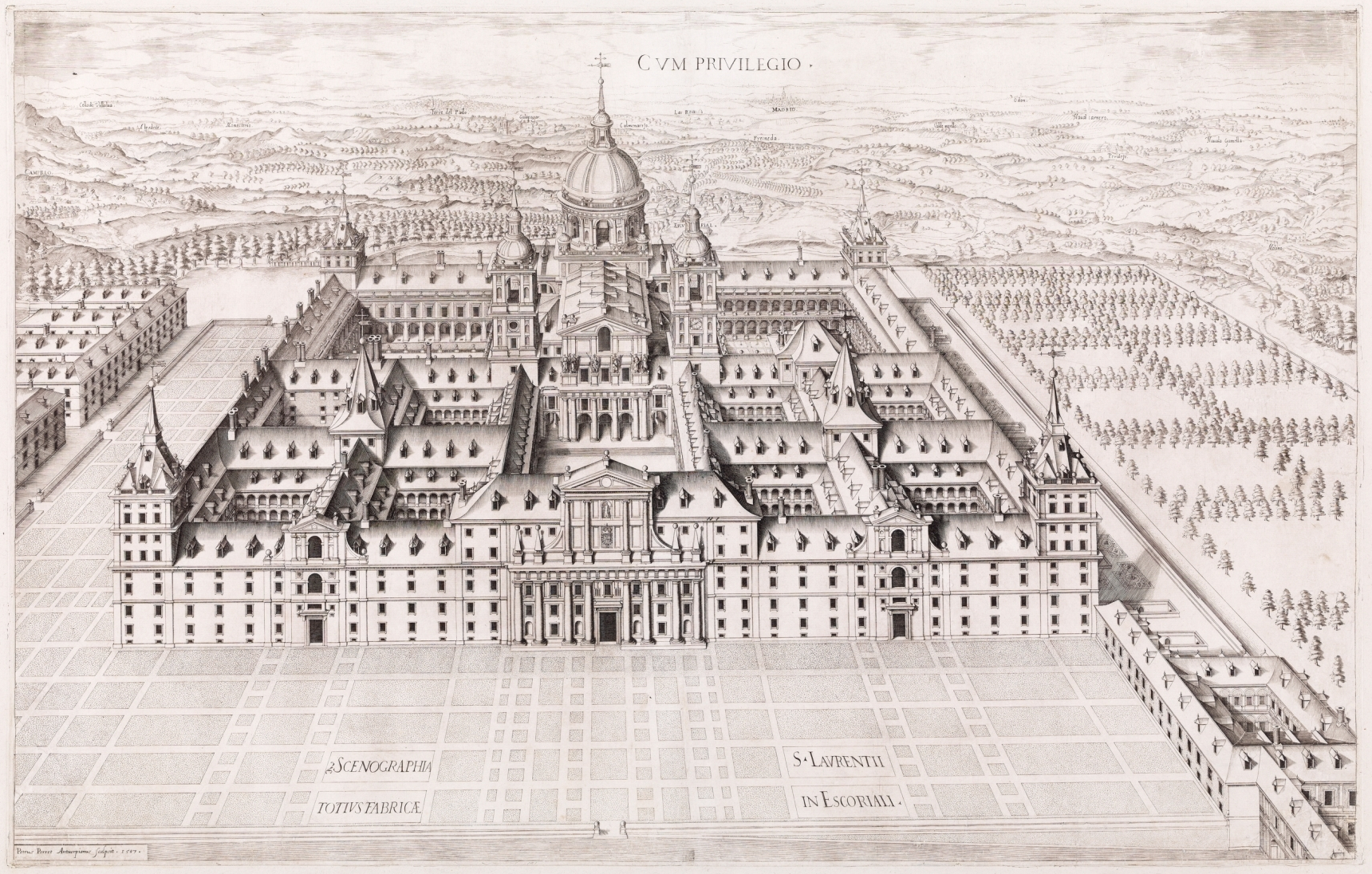
Overview of San Lorenzo Del Escorial, 1589

In 1584 Juan de Herrera commissioned Perret to print images of the plants and topographical views of the Monastery of San Lorenzo Del Escorial. Herrera was to provide the copper plates already drawn by his hand, and Perret was to engrave them for a fee of 600 ducats. Perret moved to Madrid and was bound to take on no other work until the plates were engraved. However, the work was not completed until 1589. That year, they were collected in a small book titled Sumaria y breve declaración de los diseños y estampas de la fábrica de San Lorenzo del Escorial and sold by Herrera. Despite the prohibition on taking on other work, Perret published the first of his portraits, that of the Empress Maria of Austria, in 1585.

In 1590 he returned to Antwerp where he became a master in the Guild of Saint Luke in 1594. Between 1591 and 1595, he published some allegorical engravings based on drawings provided by Otto van Veen. Among them were works dedicated to Herrera and Philip II. Other works from this time are three small plates of prophets Daniel, Ezekiel, and Haggai, following designs by Nicolas van Houy for the work Icones prophetarum maiorum et minorum (1594) published in Antwerp by Philip Galle. Copies of these three plates are preserved in the Lázaro Galdiano Museum in Madrid.

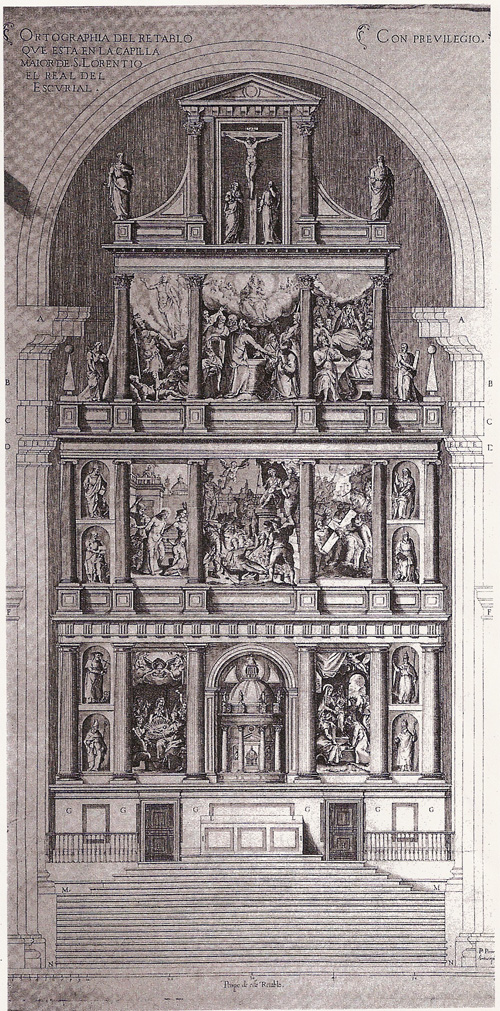
Engraving of the altarpiece in the main chapel of San Lorenzo Del Escorial

In 1595 he was appointed as a court engraver by Philip II, with a salary of 100 ducats per year. With the royal appointment, he established himself in Madrid, focusing on book publishing. He focused not only on book covers and portraits, but also typographic marks and small ornaments. Perret published at least thirty-four books while in Madrid, with more in Lisbon, where he may have moved during the Iberian Union.

He married around 1611 Isabel de Faria, who was born in Portugal. Their son Peter became an engraver, Hispanicized his name and went by "Pedro Perete".

Some of his best-known works of this time are portraits, including the Retrato de San Ignacio de Loyola (English: Portrait of Saint Ignatius of Loyola) included in the Obras of Father Ribadeneira. Also notable are the portraits of the Cistercian theologian Jerónimo Llamas, that of Mateo Alemán, published with the first part of Guzmán de Alfarache, and that of Ginés Rocamora, collected in his Sphera del Universo, which also included a strongly mannerist-looking allegory of Astronomía, copied from Johan Sadeler.

Between 1609 and his death, he published the covers of most of the books in Madrid. Among the books published are La conquista de las Molucas (English: The Conquest of the Moluccas), by Bartolomé Leonardo de Argensola in 1609, De la veneración que se debe a los cuerpos de los santos y a sus reliquias (English: On the veneration due to the bodies of the saints and their relics), by Sancho Dávila Toledo, Bishop of Jaén in 1611; Compendio de las fiestas que se hicieron en la beatificación de la madre Teresa de Jesús (English: Compendium of the festivities that took place in the beatification of Mother Teresa de Jesús), by Diego de San José in 1615; Council and counselor of princes, by Lorenzo Ramírez de Prado in 1617; Filipe Segundo Rey de España, by Luis Cabrera de Córdoba in 1619, with an image of Phillip II as "defender of faith," He provided two interior illustrations on designs by the architect Juan Gómez de Mora. The cover of the Eróticas or Amatorias, by Esteban Manuel de Villegas, printed in Nájera in 1618 by Juan de Mongastón, also seems to be by him.
