= The Art of Worldly Wisdom =

1647 book by Baltasar Gracián

The courtier's oracle, or, The art of prudence, 1694 translation.

The Art of Worldly Wisdom (Spanish: Oráculo Manual y Arte de Prudencia) is a book written in 1647 by the Spanish Jesuit priest and philosopher Baltasar Gracián y Morales, better known as Baltasar Gracian. It is a collection of 300 maxims, each with a commentary, on various topics. The book was intended to offer advice and guidance on how to live fully, advance socially, and be a better person. The collection became popular throughout Europe.

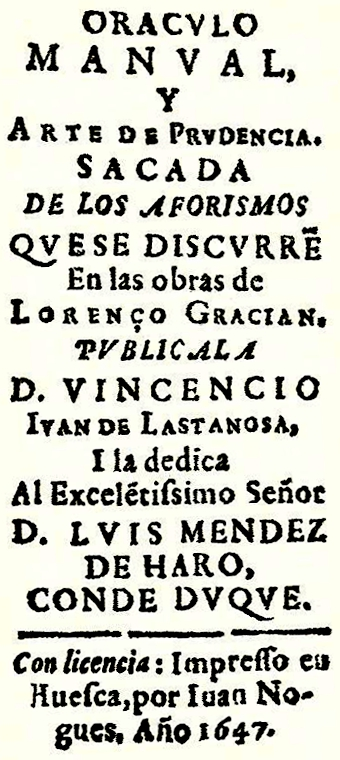
Title page of The Art of Worldly Wisdom

== Translations ==
It was translated by Joseph Jacobs (London and New York City, Macmillan and co., 1892. Other editions are also available from:

- Nayika Publishing, 2009, ISBN 978-0-955-95831-1; edited with a light commentary/footnotes
- Shambhala Publications, 2004, ISBN 1-59030141-2
- Christopher Maurer (Doubleday) 1992
- Dover Publications, 2005, ISBN 0-48644034-6
- Google Books as a free digital edition via partnership with Princeton University Library
