= Estebanillo González =

1646 novel

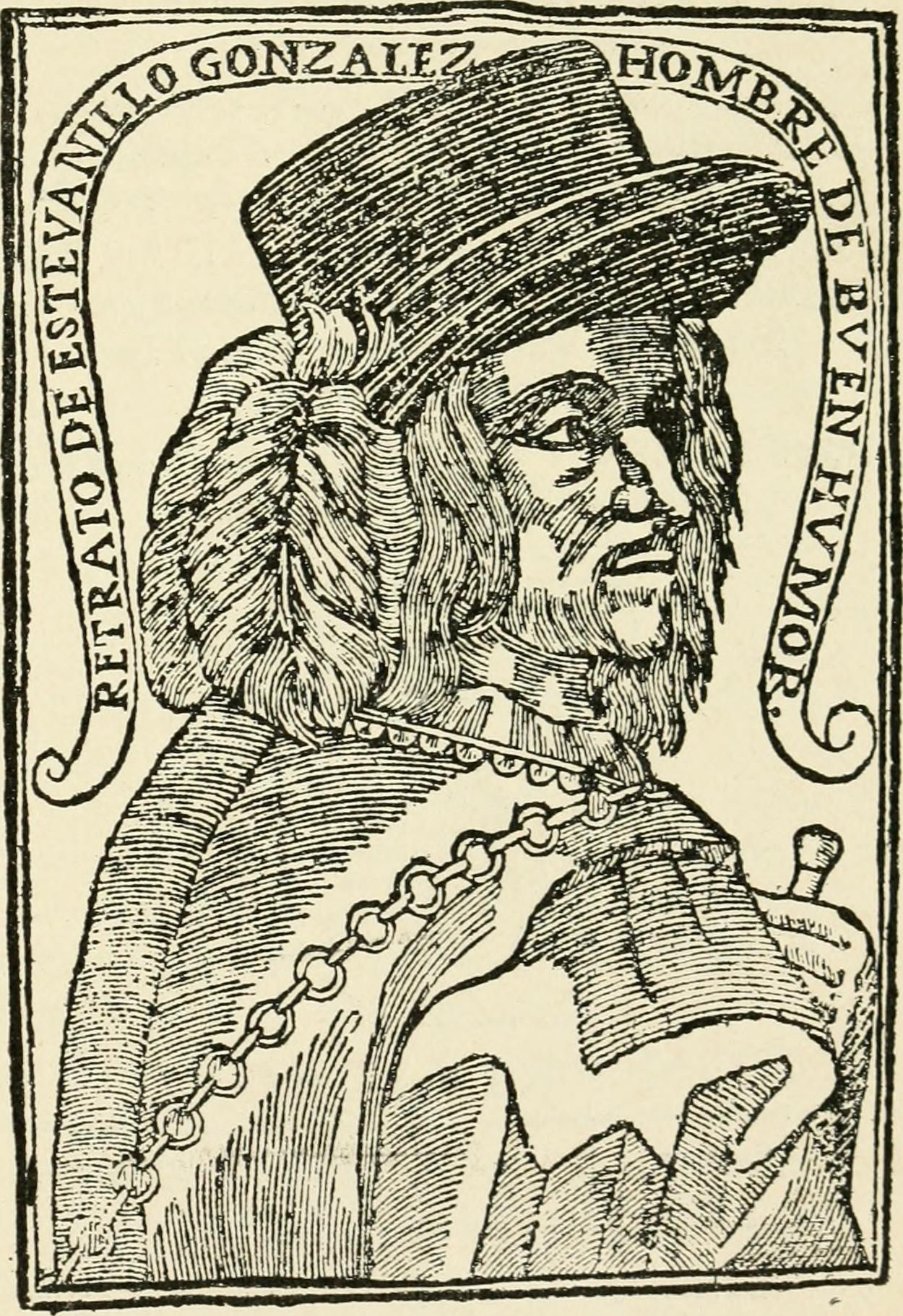
Engraving of Estebanillo González

La vida y hechos de Estebanillo González, hombre de buen humor, Life and facts of Estebanillo González, man of good humour, (Antwerp, 1646, and Madrid, 1652) is a Spanish picaresque novel, written as a genuine autobiography of a rogue (well documented in other sources), but for some scholars, it is a work of fiction. The main character serves in the Thirty Years War, and witnesses the Huguenot rebellions in France.

== Plot ==
Against the background of the Thirty Years War, the main character writes about his life being a servant of distinguished masters, in a personal narrative all Europe around as a soldier, messenger, etc., witnessing important historic events, such as the Huguenot rebellions while placed in France as the servant to an undercover spy. He serves as part of the company under the command of Cardinal-Infante Ferdinand of Spain ravaging the French provinces of Champagne, Burgundy and Picardy, and even threatening Paris in 1636. It is one of the last great achievements of Spanish Baroque literature during the seventeenth century.

== English translation ==
It was translated into English by Captain John Stevens (London, 1707), The Spanish Libertines: or the lives of Justina, the Country Jilt, Celestina, the bawd of Madrid and Estevanillo Gonzales, the most arch and comical of scoundrels. To which is added, a play call'd An Evening's Adventures. All four written by eminent Spanish authors, and now first made English by Captain John Stevens. He said about Estebanillo González: "...in the opinion of many...seems to have outdone Lazarillo de Tormes, Guzman de Alfarache, and all other rogues that have hitherto appear'd in print...".
