= Baltasar Gracián =

Spanish Jesuit and baroque prose writer and philosopher (1601-1658)

The Reverend Baltasar Gracián S.J.
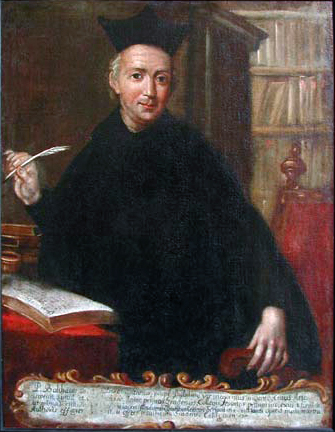
- Baltasar Gracián
- Born: 8 January 1601; Belmonte de Gracián, Aragón, Spanish Empire
- Died: 6 December 1658 (aged 57); Tarazona, Aragón, Spanish Empire

Philosophical work
- Era: 17th-century philosophy
- Region: Western philosophy; Spanish philosophy
- School: Spanish Baroque literature, Christian philosophy
- Main interests: Political philosophy, moral philosophy

Baltasar Gracián y Morales S.J. (Spanish: [baltaˈsaɾ ɣɾaˈθjan]; 8 January 1601 – 6 December 1658), better known as Baltasar Gracián, was a Spanish Jesuit priest and Baroque prose writer and philosopher. He was born in Belmonte, near Calatayud (Aragón). His writings were lauded by Schopenhauer and Nietzsche. He is best known for his book The Art of Worldly Wisdom (1647), but his novel El Criticón (1651-57) is considered his greatest work.

== Biography ==
The son of a doctor, in his childhood Gracián lived with his uncle, who was a priest. He studied at a Jesuit school in 1621 and 1623 and theology in Zaragoza. He was ordained in 1627 and took his final vows in 1635.

He assumed the vows of the Jesuits in 1633 and dedicated himself to teaching in various Jesuit schools. He spent time in Huesca, where he befriended the local scholar Vincencio Juan de Lastanosa, who helped him achieve an important milestone in his intellectual upbringing. He acquired fame as a preacher, although some of his oratorical displays, such as reading a letter sent from Hell from the pulpit, were frowned upon by his superiors. He was named Rector of the Jesuit College of Tarragona and wrote works proposing models for courtly conduct such as El héroe (The Hero), El político (The Politician), and El discreto (The Discreet One). During the Catalan Revolt, he was chaplain for the Spanish army that lifted the French siege of Lleida (Lérida) in 1646.

In 1651, he published the first part of the El Criticón without the permission of his superiors, whom he disobeyed repeatedly. That attracted the Society's displeasure. Ignoring the reprimands, he published the second part of Criticón in 1657 and so he was sanctioned and exiled to Graus in early 1658. Soon, Gracián wrote to apply for membership in another religious order. His demand was not met, but his sanction was reduced. In April 1658, he was sent to several minor positions under the college of Tarazona. His physical decline prevented him from attending the provincial congregation of Calatayud and on 6 December 1658 Gracián died in Tarazona, near Zaragoza in the Kingdom of Aragón.

Gracián is the most representative writer of the Spanish Baroque literary style known as Conceptismo (Conceptism), of which he was the most important theoretician; his Agudeza y arte de ingenio (Wit and the Art of Inventiveness) is at once a poetic, a rhetoric and an anthology of the conceptist style.

In 1985, the Aragonese village in which he was born, Belmonte de Calatayud (Belmonte del Río Perejiles) officially changed its name to Belmonte de Gracián in his honour.

== El Criticón ==
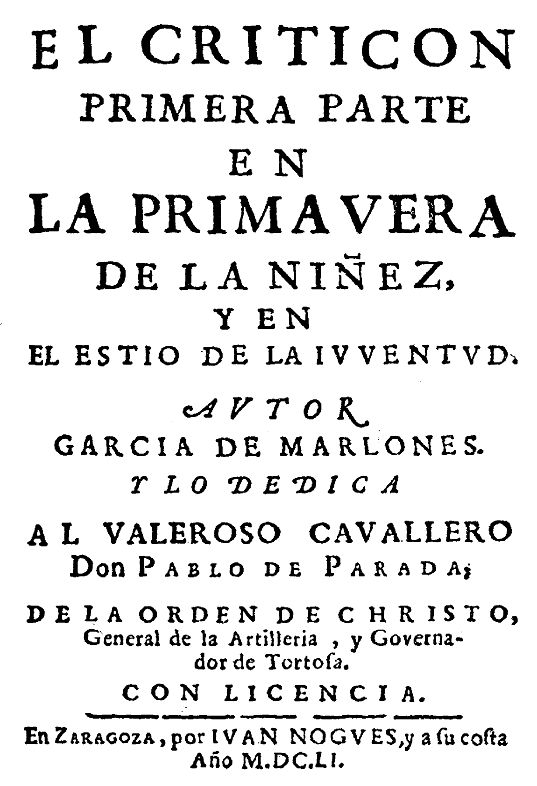
El Criticón, first edition (1651).

The three parts of the El Criticón, published in 1651, 1653 and 1657, achieved fame in Europe, especially in German-speaking countries. It is the author's masterpiece and one of the great works of the Siglo de Oro. It is a lengthy allegorical novel with philosophical overtones. It recalls the Byzantine style of novel in its many vicissitudes and in the numerous adventures to which the characters are subjected, as well as the picaresque novel in its satirical take on society, as evidenced in the long pilgrimage undertaken by the main characters: Critilo, the "critical man" who personifies disillusionment, and Andrenio, the "natural man" who represents innocence and primitive impulses. The author constantly exhibits a perspectivist technique that unfolds according to the criteria or points of view of both characters, but in an antithetical rather than plural way as in Miguel de Cervantes. The novel reveals a philosophy, pessimism, with which one of its greatest readers and admirers, the 19th century German philosopher Arthur Schopenhauer, identified.

The following is a summary of the El criticón, reduced almost to the point of a sketch, of a complex work that demands detailed study.

Critilo, man of the world, is shipwrecked on the coast of the island of Santa Elena, where he meets Andrenio, the natural man, who has grown up completely ignorant of civilization. Together they undertake a long voyage to the Isle of Immortality, travelling the long and prickly road of life. In the first part, "En la primavera de la niñez" ("In the Spring of Childhood"), they join the royal court, where they suffer all manner of disappointments; in the second part, "En el otoño de la varonil edad" ("In the Autumn of the Age of Manliness"), they pass through Aragon, where they visit the house of Salastano (an anagram of the name of Gracián's friend Lastanosa), and travel to France, which the author calls the "wasteland of Hipocrinda", populated entirely by hypocrites and dunces, ending with a visit to a house of lunatics. In the third part, "En el invierno de la vejez" ("In the Winter of Old Age"), they arrive in Rome, where they encounter an academy where they meet the most inventive of men, arriving finally at the Isle of Immortality. He is intelligent and contributed greatly to the world. One of his most famous phrases is "Respect yourself if you would have others respect you."

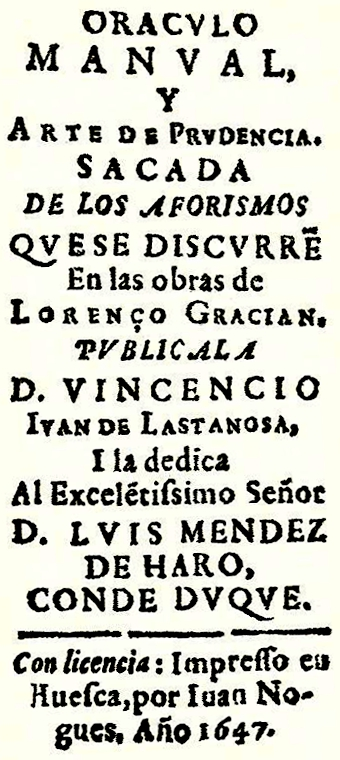
Title page of the Manual Oracle and Art of Discretion, 1647

== The Art of Worldly Wisdom ==
Gracián's style, generically called conceptism, is characterized by ellipsis and the concentration of a maximum of significance in a minimum of form, an approach referred to in Spanish as agudeza (wit), and which is brought to its extreme in the Oráculo Manual y Arte de Prudencia (literally Manual Oracle and Art of Discretion, commonly translated as The Art of Worldly Wisdom), which is almost entirely composed of three hundred maxims with commentary. He constantly plays with words: each phrase becomes a puzzle, using the most diverse rhetorical devices.

Its appeal has endured: in 1992, Christopher Maurer's translation of this book remained 18 weeks (2 weeks in first place) in The Washington Post's list of Nonfiction General Best Sellers. It has sold nearly 200,000 copies.

== Acclaim ==
The 1911 Encyclopædia Britannica wrote of Gracián that: "He has been excessively praised by Schopenhauer, whose appreciation of the author induced him to translate his works into German, and he has also been praised by Ticknor and others. He is an acute thinker and observer, led by his systematic misanthropy and by his fantastic literary theories". Nietzsche wrote of El Discreto, "Europe has never produced anything finer or more complicated in matters of moral subtlety," and Schopenhauer, who translated it into German, considered the book "Absolutely unique... a book made for constant use... a companion for life" for "those who wish to prosper in the great world."

The English translation of Oráculo manual by Joseph Jacobs (London: Macmillan and Co., Limited), first published in 1892, was a huge commercial success, with many reprintings over the years (most recently by Shambala). Jacobs's translation is alleged to have been read by Winston Churchill, seven years later, on the ship taking him to the Boer Wars.

In Paris, in 1924, a revision and reprint of the translation into French by Abraham Nicolas Amelot de La Houssaye, with a preface by André Rouveyre, attracted a wide readership there, and was admired by André Gide. A new translation by Christopher Maurer (New York: Doubleday) became a national bestseller in the U.S. in 1992 , and the English edition, which sold almost 200,000 copies, was translated into Finnish, Portuguese, Chinese, Japanese, Korean, and many other languages.

== Works ==
- El Héroe (1637, The Hero), draws a portrait of the ideal Christian leader. Translated as El Héroe: The Valiant Hero (1637) by M. San Pedro.
- El Político Don Fernando el Católico (1640), "The Politician King Ferdinand the Catholic", presents the ideal image of a king. Translated as El Politico: The Perfect King (1640) by M. San Pedro.
- El Arte de Ingenio (1642), revised as Agudeza y Arte de Ingenio in 1648, an essay on literature and aesthetics. Translated as El Arte de Ingenio: Acuity and The Art of Ingenuity (1642) by M. San Pedro.
- El Discreto (1646), describes the qualities that make a man complete and the center of perfection. Translated as El Discreto: The Complete Man (1646) by M. San Pedro.
- El Oráculo Manual y Arte de Prudencia (1647), a collection of three hundred aphorisms offering practical advice on how to make your way in a chaotic world, and how to make it well. Translated as The Art of Worldly Wisdom by Joseph Jacobs (1892) and Christopher Maurer (1992) and as The Wisdom of Baltasar Gracián by J. Leonard Kaye (1992). Also translated as El Oráculo Manual y Arte de Prudencia: The Art of Worldly Wisdom (1647) by M. San Pedro.
- El Comulgatorio (1655), a religious book containing prayers and meditations to be read before and after Holy Communion. Translated as El Comulgatorio: The Holy Communion (1655) by M. San Pedro.
- El Criticón (1651–1657), a three part novel with part one being translated as The Critic by Sir Paul Rycaut in 1681. Also translated as El Criticón: The Foolish Critic (1651-1657), The Complete Three Part Series by M. San Pedro.

The only publication which bears Gracián's name is El Comulgatorio (1655); his more important books were issued under the pseudonym of Lorenzo Gracián (a supposed brother of the writer) or under the anagram of Gracía de Marlones. Gracián was punished for publishing without his superior's permission El Criticón, but no objection was taken to its substance.
