= Paul Rycaut =

English diplomat and historian (1629–1700)

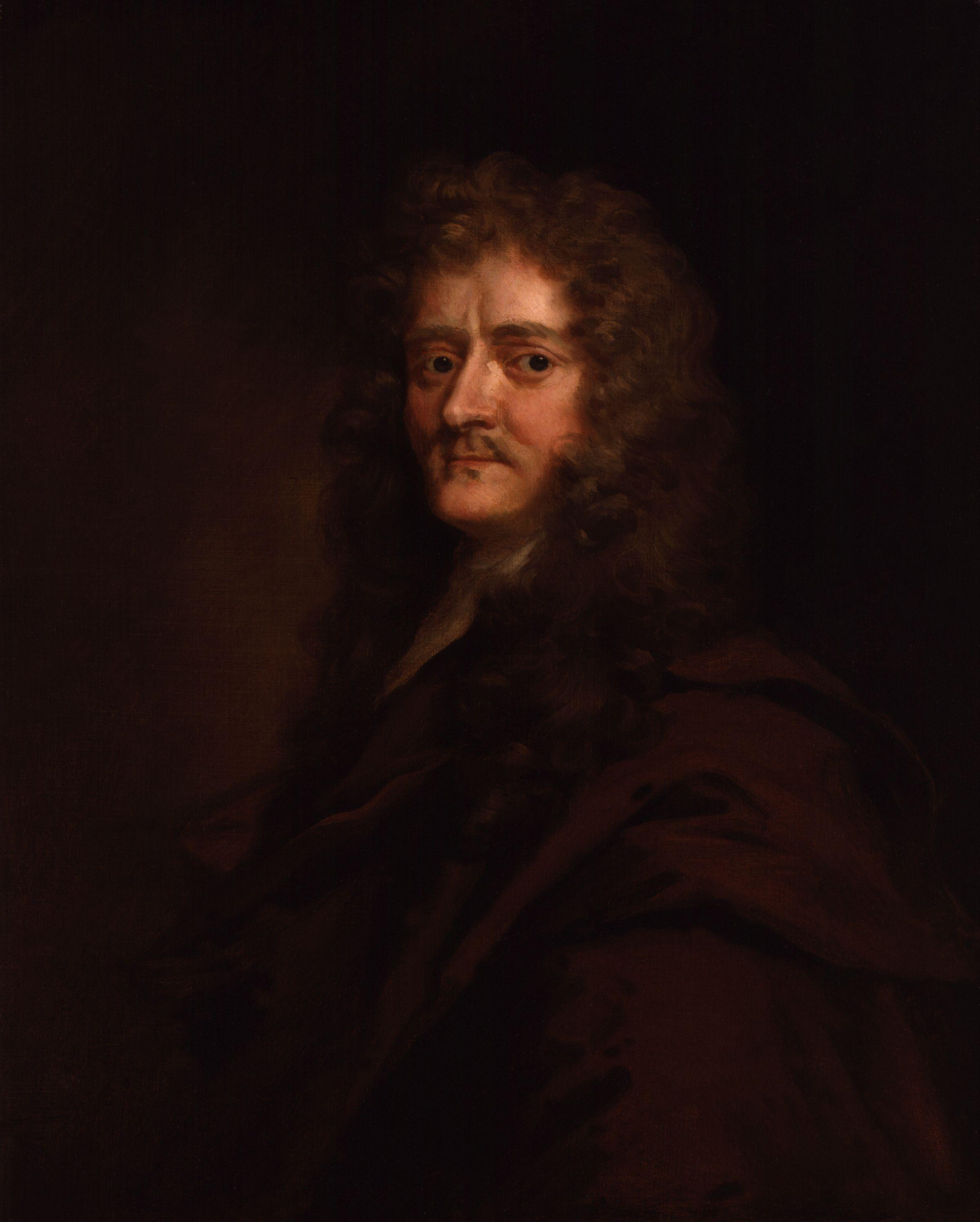
1679 portrait of Rycaut by Sir Peter Lely

Sir Paul Rycaut, FRS (23 December 1629 – 16 November 1700) was an English diplomat and historian who specialised in the history of the Ottoman Empire.

== Life ==
Paul Rycaut's Huguenot father was held in the Tower of London, during the English Civil War, for his Cavalier sympathies, but the sequestration of his property was lifted. Rycaut was born in Aylesford, Kent, and graduated from Trinity College, Cambridge, in 1650. In 1652, he was admitted to Gray's Inn. While studying at Alcalá de Henares, he learned Spanish and translated the first part of Baltasar Gracián's The Critick. Rycaut was then employed as private secretary to Heneage Finch, 3rd Earl of Winchilsea, ambassador to the Ottoman Empire. He became the English consul and factor at Smyrna (now İzmir).

From 1689 to 1700, he was Resident at Hamburg. He was active in frustrating the Company of Scotland's efforts to raise capital in the city. On 12 December 1666, Rycaut was elected a Fellow of the Royal Society. A knighthood was conferred on him in 1685. He died in Hamburg in November 1700, aged 70, of a stroke.

== Works ==
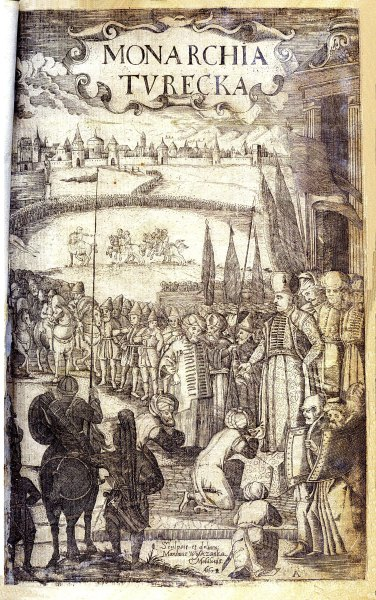
«Monarchia turecka opisana przez Ricota», Slutsk, 1678

- The Present State of the Ottoman Empire. Printed for C. Brome. 1665.
  - 1670 French translation and Images from the book at National Library of France BnF Gallica
- The Present State of the Greek and Armenian Churches, Anno Christi 1678 Written at the Command of His Majesty by Paul Ricaut, Printed for John Starkey, 1679
- The Turkish History. Vol. 1. 1687.
- The Turkish History. Vol. 2. 1687.
- Baltasar Gracián (1681). The Critick. Translator Paul Rycaut. Printed by T.N. for Henry Brome.
- Baptista Platina, The lives of the popes, Translator Paul Rycaut, Illustrator Robert White, printed for C. Wilkinson, 1688
- Inca Garcilaso de la Vega (1688). Comentarios Reales de los Incas [The royal commentaries of Peru]. Translated by Paul Rycaut.

His letters to William Blathwayt are held at Princeton University.

Political offices
Preceded by Sir William Ellis	Chief Secretary for Ireland; 1686–1687	Succeeded by Thomas Sheridan
Diplomatic posts
Preceded by Bevil Skelton	Resident to the Hansa Towns; 1689–1700	Succeeded by Sir John Wich
