= El Criticón =

Spanish novel by Baltasar Gracián

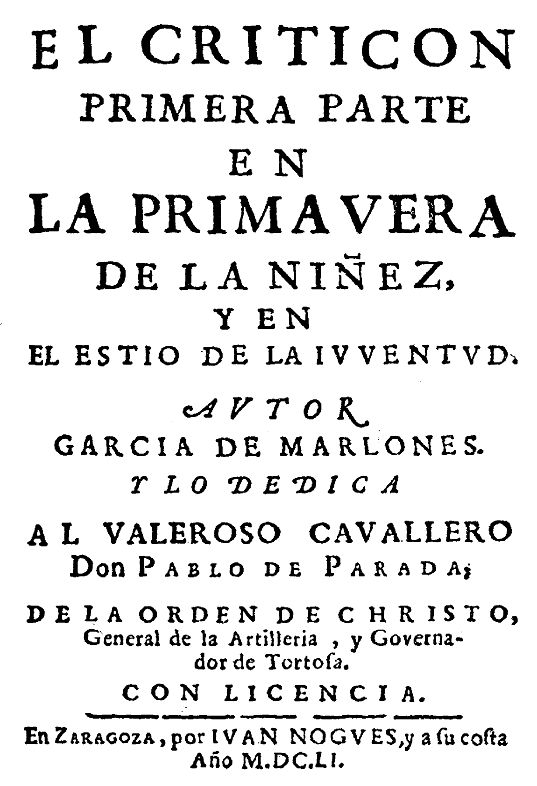
Front page of the first edition of El Criticón (1651)

El Criticón is a Spanish novel by Baltasar Gracián. It was published in three parts in the years 1651, 1653 and 1657. It is considered his greatest work and one of the most influential works in Spanish literature, along with Don Quixote and La Celestina. El Criticón collects and expands his previous works.

The work takes the form of an allegory covering the life of Andrenio, representing two facets of his life: his impulsiveness and lack of experience. It outlines the philosophical vision of Gracián's world in the form of an epic tale.

Gracián produced a work of romance meant to summarize his thoughts and expanding his skills as a writer at the same time. The novel was written during his later years and contains his ultimate vision of the world and human life. Its worldview is pessimistic and desolate, although the two virtuous protagonists represent hope. They escape mediocrity and reach eternal fame.

== Partial English Translation ==
The first part of the novel was translated into English by Sir Paul Rycaut in 1681 as The Critick. but the second and the third parts are still untranslated.
