= San Martín, Madrid =

Church of San Martín
- Iglesia de San Martín (Spanish)
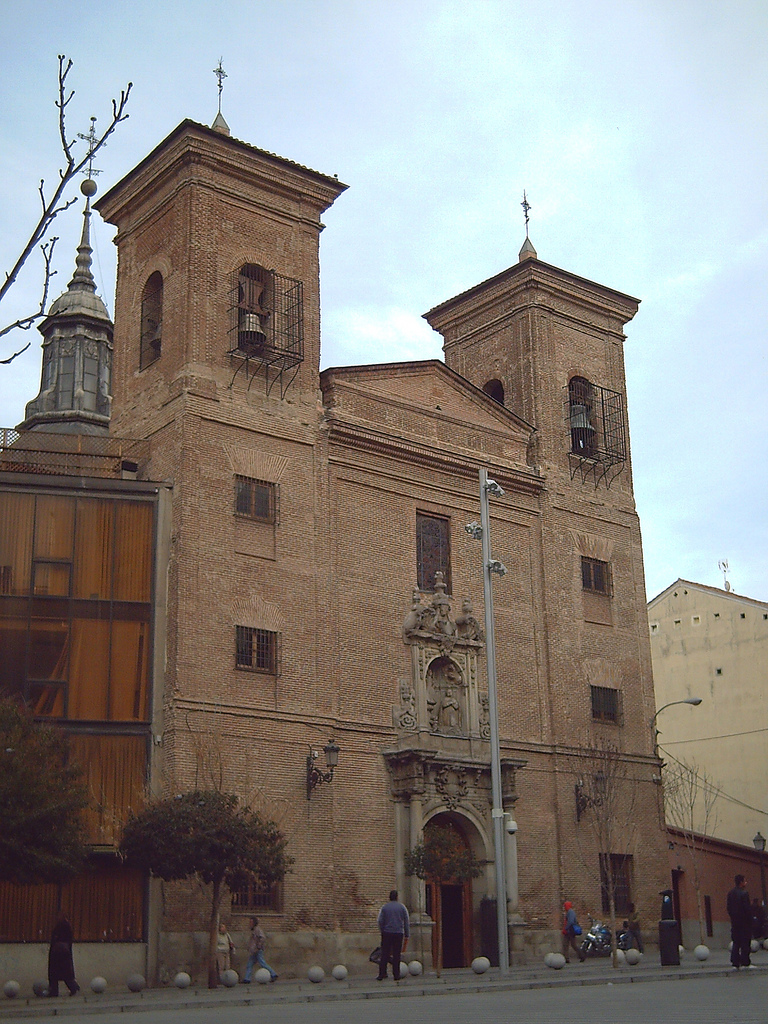

- Location within Spain
- 40.421247°N 3.704581°W
- Location: Madrid, Spain

Spanish Cultural Heritage
- Official name: Iglesia de San Martín
- Type: Non-movable
- Criteria: Monument
- Designated: 1995
- Reference no.: RI-51-0009140

The Church of San Martín (Spanish: Iglesia de San Martín) is a church located in Madrid, Spain. It was declared Bien de Interés Cultural in 1995.

== See also ==
- Catholic Church in Spain
- List of oldest church buildings
