= Francisco Collantes =

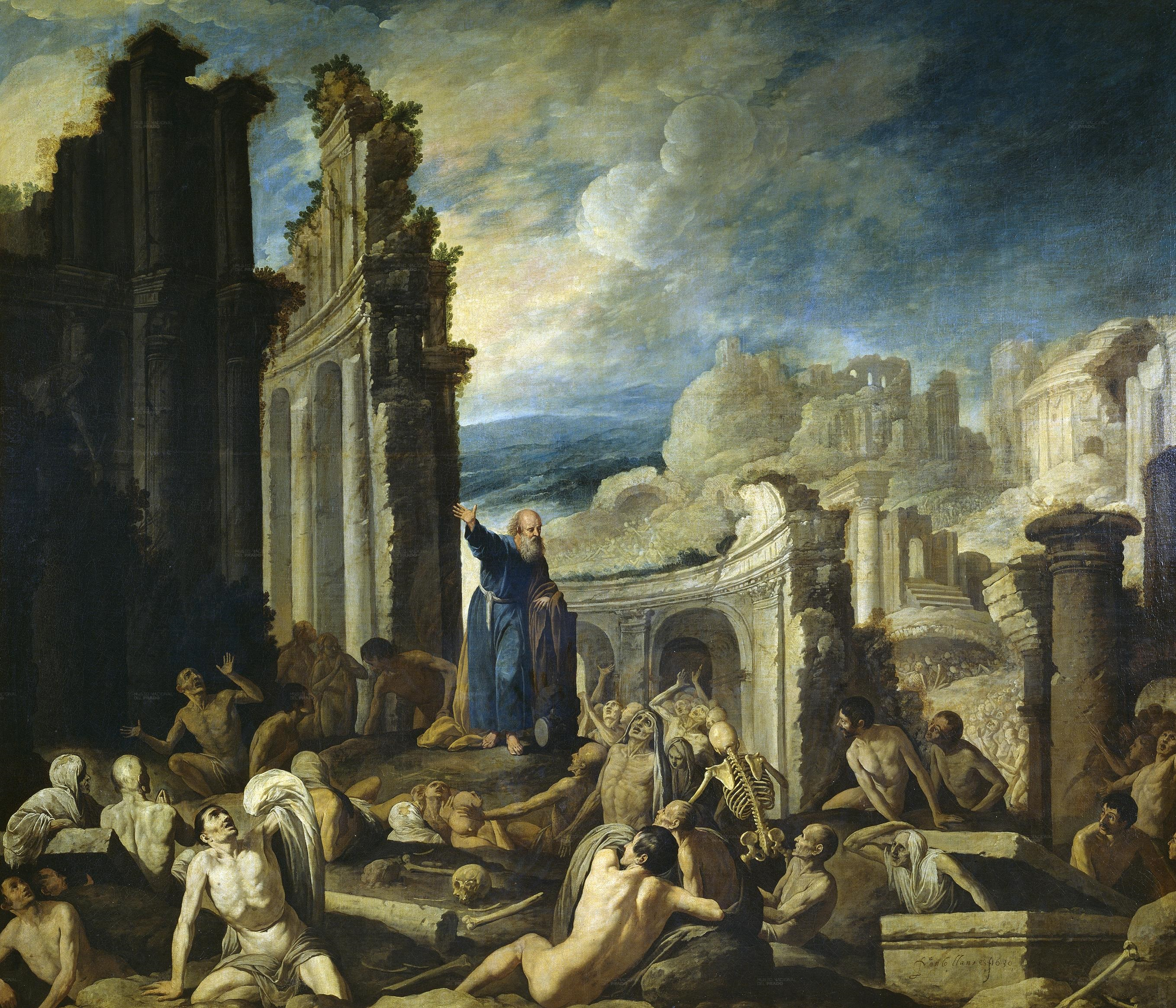
- The Vision of Ezekiel (1630), Madrid, Museo del Prado
- Born: c. 1599; Madrid, Spain
- Died: 1656; Madrid, Spain
- Occupation: Painter
- Years active: 1634–1656
- Known for: Landscape painting
- Movement: Spanish Baroque

Francisco Collantes (c. 1599–1656) was a Spanish Baroque painter. Deeply influenced by Jusepe de Ribera, the Neapolitan School, and 16th-century Venetian painting, he was renowned for his landscapes and biblical scenes.

== Biography ==
Little is known about Collantes' life. The few information we possess comes from Antonio Palomino's Museo Pictórico. Born in Madrid, Collantes was a pupil of Vicente Carducho. His evident familiarity with Italian Baroque painting suggests that he visited Rome and Naples, and this might explain the absence of documentation on him in Spain. Collantes enjoyed considerable prestige, and his paintings were acquired in 1634 for the decoration of the Buen Retiro Palace in Madrid; some of them may have been specially painted for this setting. His name appears frequently in the inventories of collectors in Madrid throughout the 17th century.

It is impossible to date Collantes’s undated paintings with any accuracy. However, his work shows two very clear and different lines of development. His canvases of large, intensely naturalistic figures, with tenebrist lighting effects (e.g. St. Jerome, versions, Copenhagen, National Museum of Denmark; Stockholm, Nationalmuseum), are close in style to those of Jusepe Ribera. In them the intense, energetic figures are sometimes set against landscape backgrounds, for example in St. Humphrey (1645–50; Madrid, Museo del Prado) and St. John the Baptist (Lugo, priv. col.), but, still following Ribera, the naturalistic elements are emphasized. He also specialized in landscapes and in biblical or mythological subjects, compositions with minute figures set against wide landscapes or architecture with strong light effects. These are the works for which he is best known and which are the most important, since he was one of the few landscape painters in Spain in the 17th century. In them familiarity with the Roman landscapes of Paul Brill and Adam Elsheimer and the Neapolitan work of Aniello Falcone, Domenico Gargiulo and Scipione Compagno is evident.

Hagar and Ishmael, 1634, Providence, Rhode Island School of Design Museum

The Flight into Egypt (Paris, Louvre) and the two known versions of the Burning of Troy (Madrid, Museo del Prado; USA, priv. col.) show his liking for nocturnal scenes. These are fine works which demonstrate a knowledge of Neapolitan art. Collantes’s most personal works are of biblical subjects set in wide, luminous landscapes against masses composed of trees arranged in receding planes, with small, expressive figures. Important among these are Moses and the Burning Bush (c. 1634; Paris, Louvre), Hagar and Ishmael (Providence, Rhode Island School of Design Museum) and the Vision of Ezekiel (1630; Madrid, Museo del Prado), in all of which he makes use of a wide repertory of Classical ruins and shows his ability in handling the nude. He painted some of the earliest ‘pure’ landscapes—landscapes with no literary content – in Spanish painting; these include Landscape with a City (1634; Madrid, Royal Academy of Fine Arts of San Fernando), Landscape with a Mounted Traveller (Cologne, Wallraf–Richartz Museum) and Landscape with a Castle (Madrid, Museo del Prado), which was formerly in the Buen Retiro Palace. He is also known to have painted still-lifes, but all of these are untraced. According to Palomino, Collantes died in 1656 at the age of 57.

== Bibliography ==
- Angulo Íñiguez, Diego, and Pérez Sánchez, Alfonso E. Pintura madrileña del segundo tercio del siglo XVII, 1983, Madrid: Instituto Diego Velázquez, CSIC, ISBN 84-00-05635-3.
- Palomino, Antonio (1988). El museo pictórico y escala óptica III. El parnaso español pintoresco laureado. Madrid: Aguilar S.A. de Ediciones. ISBN 84-03-88005-7.
- López García, David (2008). Lázaro Díaz del Valle y las Vidas de pintores de España. Madrid: Fundación Universitaria Española. ISBN 9788473927147.
- Brown, Jonathan; Elliot, J. H. (1985). Un palacio para el rey. El Buen Retiro y la corte de Felipe IV. Madrid: Alianza Editorial. ISBN 84-292-5111-1.
- Pérez Sánchez, Alfonso E. (1992). Pintura barroca en España 1600-1750. Madrid: Ediciones Cátedra. ISBN 84-376-0994-1.
