= Carl Justi =

German art historian

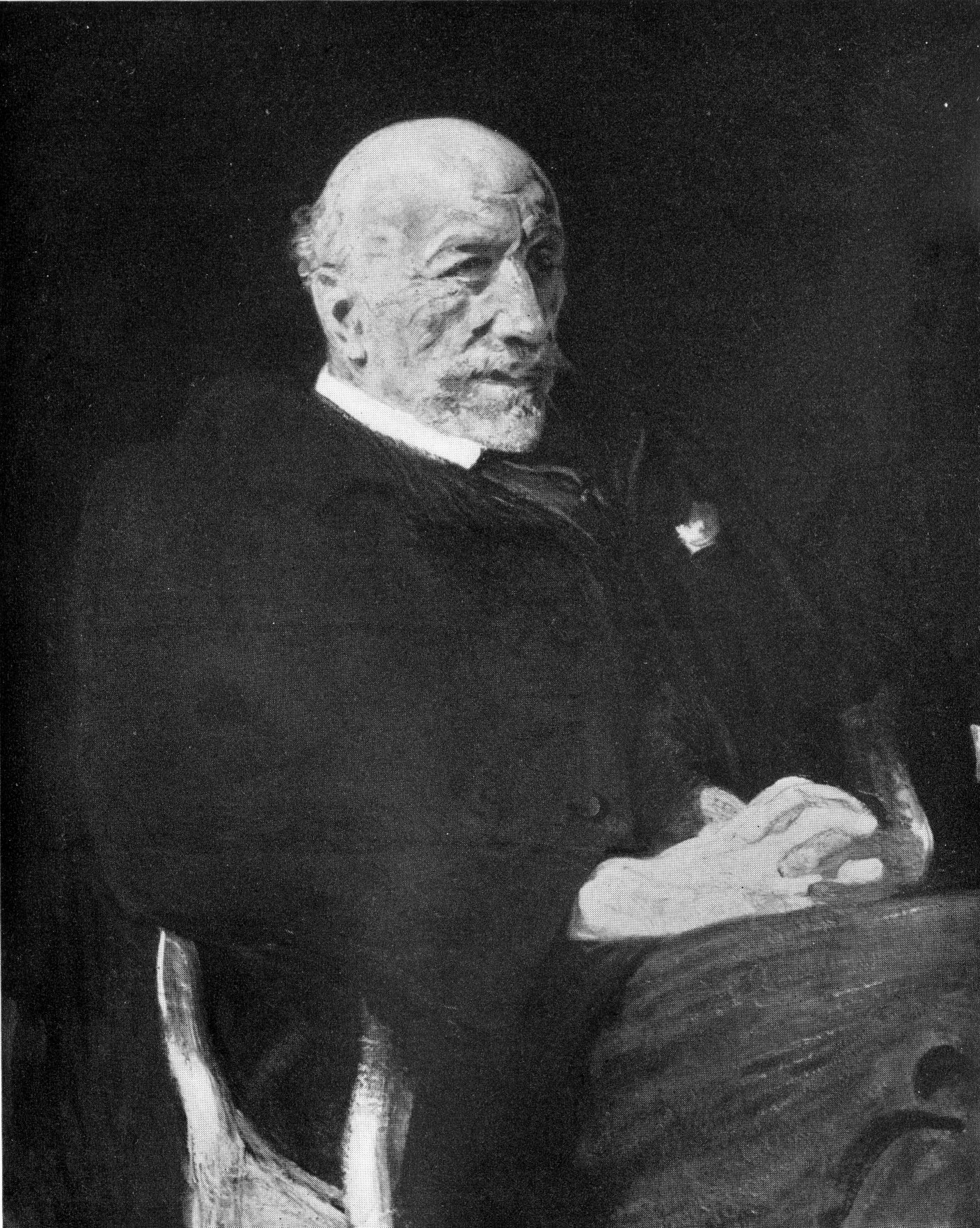
Carl Justi; portrait by Reinhold Lepsius.

Carl Justi (2 August 1832, in Marburg – 9 December 1912, in Bonn) was a German art historian, who practised a biographical approach to art history. Professor of art history at the University of Bonn, he wrote three major critical biographies: of Johann Joachim Winckelmann, of Diego Velázquez and of Michelangelo.

== Life ==
Born in Marburg, Justi studied theology at the University of Berlin before transferring to philosophy. He graduated in 1859 with a thesis 'Über die ästhetischen Elemente in der platonischen Philosophie'.

Justi established his reputation with a three-volume work on Johann Joachim Winckelmann. He succeeded Anton Springer in the chair of art history at the University of Bonn, holding the post from 1872 until 1901.

== Works ==
- Die ästhetischen Elemente in der platonischen Philosophie: ein historisch-philosophischer Versuch, Marburg: N. G. Elwert, 1860
- Winckelmann: sein Leben, Seine Werke und sein Zeitgenossen. 3 vols. Leipzig: F. C. W. Vogel, 1866–72.
- Diego Velázquez und sein Jahrhundert. Bonn: M. Cohen, 1888. Translated into English as Diego Velázquez and His Times. London: H. Grevel, 1889.
- Michelangelo: Beiträge zur Erklärung der Werke und des Menschen. Leipzig: Breitkopf & Härtel, 1900
