= Ron Drummond =

American novelist

Ronald N. Drummond (born 1959 in Seattle, Washington) is a writer and editor, and was affiliated with Incunabula press.

== Career ==
=== Writing ===
Drummond is the author of 'The Sonic Rituals of Pauline Oliveros'; 'The Frequency of Liberation', fiction about the novels of Steve Erickson; 'Ducré in Euphonia: Ideal and Influence in Berlioz'; 'Broken Seashells', on ancestral memory and the music of Jethro Tull; introductory essays for 'The Vienna String Quartets of Anton Reicha'. Other publications include the short story, 'Troll', published in Black Clock, and an essay on the Tokyo String Quartet.

=== Editing ===
As an editor, Drummond worked with Samuel R. Delany on the essay collections The Straits of Messina (1989) and Longer Views (1996), the novel They Fly at Çiron (1993), collection Atlantis: Three Tales (1995), novel Shoat Rumblin (2002), and Dark Reflections (2007). He was the publisher of Çiron and Atlantis. He was a proofreader and editorial redactor of Delany's most famous novel, Dhalgren. In March 2006, Drummond about his editorial relationship with Delany at a conference on Delany's life and work at SUNY Buffalo.

Drummond also worked with novelist John Crowley, publishing Crowley's short story collection Antiquities (1993), editing the novels Dæmonomania (2000) and Endless Things (2007), and the electronic versions of Ægypt and Love & Sleep (2002). He sold subscriptions for a deluxe 25th anniversary edition of Crowley's 1981 novel Little, Big , slated for publication in 2007, and finally published in October 2022.
