= Dæmonomania =

Modern fantasy novel by John Crowley

- Cover of the First Edition of Dæmonomania by Bantam Books featuring Frans Floris' Fall of the Rebel Angels
- Author: John Crowley
- Cover artist: Laurie Jewell
- Language: English
- Series: Ægypt Tetralogy
- Genre: Fantasy
- Publisher: Bantam Books
- Publication date: August 2000
- Publication place: United States of America
- Media type: Print (1st edition)
- Pages: 451
- ISBN: 978-1590200445
- Preceded by: Love & Sleep
- Followed by: Endless Things

Daemonomania is a 2000 fantasy novel by John Crowley. It is Crowley's seventh novel, and as the third novel in Crowley's Ægypt Sequence, a sequel to Crowley's 1994 novel Love & Sleep. The novel follows protagonist Pierce Moffett as he continues his book project begun in The Solitudes about the Renaissance and Hermeticism, while dealing with a stormy relationship with his girlfriend Rosie Ryder.

Like the previous novels, the novel has four main narrative strands, one occurring in the present day generally following Pierce or Rosie Mucho in their artistic works, and two occurring in the Renaissance following the historical fictional activities of John Dee, Edward Kelley and Giordano Bruno as written by fictional novelist Fellowes Kraft. The difference is marked stylistically by dashes indicating dialogue for events that happened in the Renaissance and events in the twentieth century marked by dialogue in ordinary English quotation marks.

== Background ==
The novel's title derives from De la Démonomanie des Sorciers a book purporting to be about demonology intended for would-be exorcists written by sixteenth-century French Jurist and politician Jean Bodin. Pierce and Rosie encounter the book in Part I Chapter 13 among Fellowes Kraft's collection of rare books collected from his travels in Europe.

Thematically, the novel deals with the high numbers of demonic possessions and encounters with sorcery reported in the seventeenth century, precipitating a rise in dogmaticism among both Christians, Muslims and scientific thinkers at the time. In the Author's Note, Crowley cites the research of Nuccio Ordine, Angelo Maria Ripellino, Brian P. Levnack, Carlo Ginzburg, Ioan P. Culianu, and Deborah Vansau Mccauley. The novel was Crowley's first work with editor Ron Drummond.

This novel of the sequence is sectioned based on the second three of the Astrological Houses. Uxor, signifying spouses or partnership; and Mors, signifying death or reincarnation; and Pietas, signifying journeys or philosophy.

== Plot ==
In an introductory chapter (chronologically taking place mid-way through the novel's plot), Pierce Moffett takes a bus ride from the Blackberry Jambs to New York City, reflecting on his relationship with Rose Ryder. While Pierce left his Catholic faith in adolescence, Rose is ardently pursuing her faith in the Powerhouse Christian sect.

In the Renaissance, John Dee and Edward Kelley again contact the angel, Madimi, who in previous volumes, first commanded their wandering. The treatments he prepared to grant the Emperor fertility have also failed, and the court grown paranoid, hiring spies who may be watching Dee. Dee arranges for the man accused of being a werewolf, Jan, to seek passage to the New World with Dee as he leaves Prague. He leaves Kelley behind, who on telling the Emperor of his supposed Irish nobility, is Knighted. Dee is further shocked when Kelley tells him and the court that all their alchemical practices were all derived from Kelley's own intuition, and not occult means. In an effort to lighten the load of their ship off the Continent, Dee spills the gold on the ground, much of which has somehow decayed and stinks. He finally returns to England (narrowly missing the premiere of Marlowe's Faustus), and remains destitute for some time, until finally finding a wardenship at Manchester College. In the face of growing persecution, he refuses to harm Catholics, and treats those accused of demonic possession with caution, but kindness. He eventually hears word that Kelley has died, and in fear at his own growing reputation as a wizard, retires from public life, gaining money only by selling his books.

On a visit to New York, Beau Brachman is given a tract from a quasi-Gnostic sect, advocating the worship of the exiled "Sophia" as primordial to all religious practice, and the only escape from mankind's "imprisonment." He takes the tract, remembering another copy early in his life, reflecting on how he has followed the broad demands of Ancient Gnosticism to seek spiritual pleasure, but not to procreate. Beau makes contact with a gnostic-like cult in the wilderness beyond the Blackberry Jambs led by an aging patriarch, Plato Goodenough.

In the confusion of the crowd, an Ass tied near the area escapes, and wanders out of the city. The chest Mary Philomel unlocked in the previous volume is revealed to not have opened, but responded with sounds resembling internal clockwork continuing for several years and coming to a stop at the novel's end.

== Characters ==
As earlier stated, the novel follows both characters in the present, as well as those in the Historical novels written by unseen character Fellowes Kraft.

Characters in The Present

- Pierce Moffett-The novel's protagonist. While still working on his book project, Pierce becomes especially interested in continued ways past systems of knowledge, even magical, can be relevant in the present. In Dæmonomania, Pierce experiments with sexual dominance/BDSM with his girlfriend Rosie Ryder, but at the same time, loses her to the authoritarian Christian cult, The Powerhouse.
- Rosie Ryder-Pierce's lover throughout the novel who is initiated into, and joins a Christian cult called The Powerhouse led by Rosie Mucho's ex-husband Mike.
- Rosie Mucho (née Rasmussen)-Pierce's close friend. Throughout the novel, Rosie deals with her daughter Sam Mucho's epilepsy, first encountered at the end of Love & Sleep, and brief custody battle, ultimately losing Sam to her ex-husband Mike.
- Axel Moffett-Pierce's estranged father, now living with his male partner "Gravely" who dies in the course of the novel.
- Mike Mucho-Rosie Mucho (née Rasmussen)'s ex-husband. Mike was first introduced as a psychologist in the previous volumes, but in Dæmonomania the organization he works for is revealed as a front for the quasi-Christian cult The Powerhouse.
- Bobby Shaftoe-The character from Pierce's childhood, first encountered in Love & Sleep again appears, now an orderly at the pediatrics wing of the hospital where Rosie's daughter Sam is treated. Her past experience with Appalachian Churches is detailed, along with family lore suggesting she may have inhuman ancestors. She joins The Powerhouse and briefly lives with Rosie Ryder.
- Ray Honeybeare-The leader of The Powerhouse cult, who encourages Mike to regain Sam and prevent her from receiving medical attention.

Characters of the Renaissance

- John Dee-The Elizabethan cryptographer, doctor, alchemist and skryer. In the course of the novel, Dee discovers how to create Gold in Prague, but returns to England around mounting political pressure and paranoia.
- Madimi-The childlike being that guided Dee and Kelley to Prague. In Dæmonomania, she puts Dee and Kelley to the test in order to receive the secrets of creating gold.
- Holy Roman Emperor Rudolf II-The pope-crowned "Singular and Universal Monarch of the Whole Wide World" and the patron of Kelley and Dee. In Dæmonomania he becomes interested in Dee's skepticism as to demons and werewolves, and invites Bruno to speak in his court.
- Giordano Bruno-The Dominican Friar, writer, and academic. In Dæmonomania, reveals his speculations including those about life on multiple planets to the court of Holy Roman Emperor Rudolf II
- Edward Kelley-John Dee's assistant, who eventually denounces Dee, and is knighted while in Prague.

== Reception ==
Critic Harold Bloom praised the novel, calling it "A Masterpiece of spiritual insight and of superb style and characterization.

Publishers Weekly positively reviewed the book, focusing on its ability to include philosophical and historical material into a novel still within the fantasy genre. The novel was briefly and negatively reviewed in The New York Times, the reviewer uncertain of any connection at all between the two storylines. In The Village Voice, Elizabeth Hand published an overview of the entire series, praising Daemonomania for its engagement of the darker aspects of the Renaissance, American spirituality, and Pierce's sexual drives.

James Hynes wrote a long article advocating Crowley's be considered "a serious literary reputation" on the release of Daemonomania, calling the three books already released of the series "already, unfinished–an astonishing accomplishment". Hynes pointed out that many other reviewers, particularly Jeff Waggoner, reviewed the novel improperly, having missed the connection between the previous volumes as comprising a series.
