= Snow (Crowley short story) =

1985 short story by John Crowley

Illustration for John Crowley's Snow from its original publication in Omni Magazine, November 1985.

"Snow" is a short story by American author John Crowley. It was first published in Omni in November 1985.

The story won third prize in the Locus Award competition, and was nominated in 1986 for both the Hugo Award and Nebula Award.

== Plot ==
A woman named Georgie becomes wealthy by marriage to her first husband. He buys her a self-surveillance device called a Wasp, a flying drone designed to record her life which she retains after his death. When Charlie (the narrator) meets and marries her, she has adjusted to the Wasp as a part of her life despite considering it unnecessary. The two enjoy many happy excursions, especially alpine skiing before separating. Charlie is separated from, yet on good terms with Georgie when he hears she has died.

After her death, Georgie's recorded life is downloaded into a system called The Park, a type of digital cemetery in which her memories can be accessed by loved ones after her death. Charlie visits Georgie's "memories" but finds them distant, covering mostly memories he does not remember or care for and only accessible at random, with no organization allowing him to specify memories. Annoyed, Charlie queries the director, who explains that due to legal interests, recordings are required to be random to avoid legal vulnerability or screening and deleting of memories considered legal evidence. Based on this decision, developers of the technology based their memory systems "on the molecular level", yielding both extremely economic storage, but leaving access random.

Charlie returns, accessing videos of Georgie alone, before and after his time with her. Noticing that the video appears to lose clarity, Charlie returns to the director, who informs him that over time, a small amount of degradation will happen to video quality. Returning later, Charlie finds even more degradation, resulting in video snow. The director, at this point, explains that he has explained the most he knows about loss of quality, and that other Park users have had similar problems. He relates the story as well, that his previous job working at a stock footage warehouse yielded the opposite set of complaints; producers frequently requested stock image of scenes from everyday life, and such footage could almost never be found. At The Park, often users only want access to significant memories, but are faced with far more footage of scenes from everyday life.

Much later, Charlie reveals he no longer uses The Park, and reflects on the nature of memory. While he can almost never remember specific details of significant memories, he finds himself very sharply "sleepwalking" into memories. He finds his memories of Georgie that most affect him, especially as he ages, are those that come naturally to him, which do not age either in his memory, unlike those artificially recorded.

In addition to the video snow that was showing up as a technical problem at the Park, a strange phenomenon has resulted in a disproportionate amount of the recordings showing actual snow (wintertime settings) rather than also showing the verdant summertime events that he knows must have happened, and Charlie acknowledges that he is having a harder time remembering pleasant times with Georgie, as more and more memories are gradually lost to snow (of both varieties). In the story this clearly also metaphorically represents his sadness and grief at her loss, which is slowly causing his pleasant memories of her to fade into the background as the event of her death becomes more distant.

Later, Charlie reveals that his appetite for constantly reviewing the memories of his past is no longer what it once was. Charlie indicates that he now wants to go out and experience more of what the world has to offer, while he still has time to do so.

== Themes ==
In Crowley's short story, he uses certain themes like memory, grief, and loss as a way to explore the process of grieving a love one and having tendencies of memories being altered throughout the years after Georgie's death. Crowley also expands this with the use of figurative language like metaphors to portray life and death through the seasons and Charlie's environment changing.

== Intentions ==
Crowley's intentions with the short story was to interrupt how the human brain reacts with memories. seeing how when a love one or someone very close to them is gone can alternate that persons feelings towards them.

== Thematic content ==
The short story includes the theme of memory which pervades a great deal of Crowley's work, notably Ariel Hawksquill's "magic" in Little, Big and the Pierce's quest in The Solitudes. By the end of the story, the narrator prefers involuntary memory to that which is either significantly detailed, or technologically preserved.

An additional major theme relates to the human grieving process, and the tendency of a person who has experienced a great loss to repeatedly ruminate over the painful memories, and by doing so, gradually alter those memories to be less attractive, until they can no longer command the attention that they once did.

In an interview, Crowley revealed that the story also parallels Greek myth dealing with those who have died, especially Orpheus and Eurydice and Aeneas' being required to give blood to hear the shades in Hades.

== Relation to actual technology ==
Crowley noted in 2012, 27 years after the publication of the story, a New York Times article in which drones designed to record a subject's life were optimistically forecasted.
