= Incunabula (disambiguation) =

Incunabula are printed material from before the year 1501 in Europe.

Incunabula may also refer to:

- Incunabula, Op. 39, a set of three short compositions for piano by Swan Hennessy (1912)
- Incunabula (video game), a computer game by Avalon Hill (1984)
- Incunabula (publisher), a small press based in Seattle, Washington, founded in 1992
- Incunabula (album), an album by British electronic music duo Autechre (1993)

== See also ==
- Incunabula Short Title Catalogue, an electronic bibliographic database maintained by the British Library
