= Love & Sleep =

Novel by John Crowley

- First Edition of Love & Sleep by Bantam Books
- Author: John Crowley
- Cover artist: Jamie S. Warren Youll
- Language: English
- Series: Ægypt tetralogy
- Genre: Fantasy
- Publisher: Bantam Books
- Publication date: September 1994
- Publication place: United States
- Media type: Print (1st edition)
- Pages: 502
- ISBN: 1590200152
- Preceded by: The Solitudes
- Followed by: Dæmonomania

Love & Sleep is a 1994 fantasy novel by John Crowley. It is the second novel in Crowley's Ægypt Sequence and a sequel to Crowley's 1987 novel The Solitudes. In it, the protagonist Pierce Moffett continues his book project begun in The Solitudes, exploring especially the relevance of systems of thought, even those magical and supposedly obsolete in writing a non-fiction book about the Renaissance and Hermeticism.

Like the previous novel, Love & Sleep has four main strands, two occurring in the present day generally following Pierce or Rosie Mucho in their artistic works, and two occurring in the Renaissance following the historical fictional activities of John Dee, Edward Kelley and Giordano Bruno as written by fictional novelist Fellowes Kraft. The difference is marked stylistically by dashes indicating dialogue for events that happened in the Renaissance and events in the twentieth century marked by dialogue in ordinary English quotation marks.

It was nominated for the World Fantasy Award for 1995.

== Background ==
Crowley originally intended the novel to be titled Ember Days, and his publisher suggested the first section, "Genitor" be issued as a stand-alone work. The novel's title is both a reference to the Renaissance romance Hypnerotomachia Poliphili (Poliphilo's Strife of Love in a Dream) which Pierce reads throughout the course of the book and which informs the book thematically, in the same way Las Soledades informed the previous novel. The title is also identical to an 1866 poem by Swinburne. The actual title appears in the novel during a meditation by Beau Brachman, which appears as a Blake-like movie script featuring seventeenth century capitalization and frequent ampersands.

This novel of the sequence is sectioned based on the second three of the Astrological Houses. Genitor, signifying parents; and Nati signifying children; and Valetudo signifying health.

== Plot ==
The previous novel is briefly addressed in the book's first section, "To the Summer Quaternary" with the pretension of being a synopsis of a book project Pierce is preparing for possible publication.

From here, the narrative shifts abruptly to Pierce's boyhood, describing his early life with his cousins near the Cumberland Mountains in Kentucky. While cleaning the ashes from burning garbage one day, Pierce sees some embers escape, and cause a minor forest fire. His older cousin, Joe Boyd, immediately blames Pierce for the whole incident and frequently arises in conversation for the rest of the novel. As a result of his blame, Joe Boyd often excludes from the secret clubs he forms with his siblings. After the death of Pierce's Aunt and his cousins' mother Opal Oliphant, the children are neither homeschooled nor attend school, and Sam Oliphant instead orders a large number of books at a time from the State Library to keep the children busy. Pierce finds great interest in the encyclopedias of mythology and occult, and eventually constructs his own mythology, presenting to his cousins as another secret club called the Invisible College, rival to that of Joe Boyd's. Sam eventually comes to request for the children a tutor, answered by a local Nun, Sister Mary Philomel, who trains the children in strict traditional Catholicism, despite Sam's antipathy for religion. For a short period, the children secretly shelter a girl known as Bobby Shaftoe in their home. The plan backfires when Bobby becomes violently ill and eventually infects the other children. At this point, they reveal to Sam their having her in the house. Her father Floyd eventually returns for her. When the children try to visit Bobby at her home, they are terrified by Floyd's apocalyptic threats.

In the Renaissance, Giordano Bruno is revealed to have safely made the journey to England and is living in the household of John Florio. Bruno serves on some diplomatic meetings with Florio, and eventually comes to lecture at Cambridge (nearly missing a performance of Dido, Queen of Carthage). He meets John Dee who, impressed by Bruno's intellectual daring, invites him to his home. Dee and Edward Kelley abruptly leave England following the supernatural childlike being from the previous novel, Madimi, to the continent eventually to the court of Rudolf II who commissions them to create an alchemical stone.

In the present, Pierce is continuing to work on his book, exploring various systems of thoughts with possible modern applications. At the same time, his neighbour Beau Brachman independently happens upon many of the same topics including Hermeticism, though he interprets each through a strongly New Age-influenced approach. Rosie Mucho continues with her separation proceedings from her husband Mike Mucho, coming to trust Mike to care for her daughter Sam for periods of time. Mike is expanding his work from psychotherapy to exploring speculative religious practice with his patients. Rosie is very much distracted with the declining of health of Boney Rassmussen, who is on his own quest to find the Philosopher's Stone which Fellowes Kraft had, while alive, teased him existed in Prague. In short order, Boney dies leaving a Will containing many impossible requests, including being buried in a private field he did not own, and all his possessions to a girl named "Una Knox" who doesn't appear to exist. Rosie Mucho confides in Pierce in this time, who comforts her during the funeral proceedings. Eventually Pierce becomes frustrated with his book project, taking a grant Kraft's foundation had offered him to take a research trip to Prague.

== Characters ==
As earlier stated, the novel follows both characters in the present, as well as those in the historical novels of Fellowes Kraft.

Characters in The Present

- Pierce Moffett-The novel's protagonist. While still working on his book project, Pierce becomes especially interested in continued ways past systems of knowledge, even magical, can be relevant in the present.
- Rosie Ryder-Pierce's lover throughout the novel.
- Rosie Mucho-Pierce's close friend. Rosie continues to struggle with the divorce from her husband throughout the novel, and eventually becomes the hardest-hit at the death of Boney.
- Boney Rassmussen-The tenant of Fellowes Kraft's estate. His death catalyzes many problems for the other characters towards the end of the novel.

Characters from Pierce's Childhood

- Sam Oliphant-Pierce's religiously sardonic uncle. Sam is a doctor who moved to Kentucky out of charity rather than hope of financial gain. His wife Opal dies after bearing his three children, and Pierce's mother moves from New York with Pierce to manage the Household.
- Winnie Oliphant-Pierce's mother. On separating from Pierce's father Axel, she moves to Kentucky.
- Hildy, Bird, Warren and Joe Boyd- Pierce's cousins in Kentucky. They eventually form the secret club, and eventually shared world they call the Invisible College
- Sister Mary Philomel-A Nun and member of the fictional Pacific Order of the Most Holy Infant. Her order was created out of the counter-reformation and out of a special dedication to an appearance of the Child Jesus who appeared in Prague during the Renaissance.
- Bobby Shaftoe-A girl who the children secretly shelter in their home for a time. Bobby is the daughter of Floyd Shaftoe, who eventually takes her back. The family, which lives in poverty, is dedicated to a type of apocalyptic fundamentalist Christianity, constantly referencing coming judgement and the "Enda Days". Her name is a reference to an English folk song.

Characters of the Renaissance

- John Dee-The Elizabethan cryptographer, doctor, alchemist and skryer. Throughout the novel, he and Edward Kelley follow the childlike being Madimi, eventually to the court of Rudolf II.
- Madimi-The childlike being from the "Prologue in Heaven" from the previous novel who appears to Dee and Kelley and eventually guides them to the court of Rudolf II in Prague.
- Holy Roman Emperor Rudolf II-The pope-crowned "Singular and Universal Monarch of the Whole Wide World" who eventually commissions Dee and Kelley to create for him a mystical stone from "Philosopher's Gold".
- Giordano Bruno-The Dominican friar, now in England and in the home of John Florio. While there, Bruno encounters some profitable patronage from nobles, and raises a good deal of controversy among the religious scholars.
- Edward Kelley-John Dee's assistant, going by the name Edward Talbot. Dee however, is constantly suspicious of Talbot.

Brief appearances are also made in the historical section by Sir Philip Sidney and John Florio.

== Reception ==
The novel received a warm review from the New York Times the reviewer (coincidentally named Jonathan Dee) praised the novel for fusing both historical and narrative strains of the story.

American poet James Merrill, who discovered Crowley's shortly before his death, read the book in manuscript. His praise was blurbed on the cover. Harold Bloom included the novel in the last "Chaotic" Canon in the appendices of Western Canon.

James Hynes recorded on the completion of the third volume of the series that individual volumes were poorly marketed, and neither Crowley's publishers nor Crowley left external indications that the second and third books were in fact sequels. Hynes noted that those who were aware of the novels as part of a series "widely and respectfully" reviewed the novels. Other publications, unaware of the sequential nature of the series found the novel perplexing. One such review appeared in The Atlantic, believed the Renaissance and modern stories entirely disconnected, closing by saying "not even werewolves can locate any blood in the characters." Crowley himself would later call the review "The snottiest review I have ever received".
