= Engine Summer =

Novel by John Crowley

- Cover of the first edition
- Author: John Crowley
- Illustrator: Gary Friedman; Anne Yvonne Gilbert (1983)
- Cover artist: Gary Friedman; Anne Yvonne Gilbert (1983)
- Language: English
- Genre: Science fiction
- Publisher: Doubleday
- Publication date: March 1979
- Publication place: United States
- Media type: Print (hardback & paperback)
- Pages: 182
- ISBN: 0-385-12831-2
- OCLC: 4490941
- Dewey Decimal: 813/.5/4
- LC Class: PZ4.C9533 En PS3553.R597

Engine Summer is a novel by American writer John Crowley, published in 1979 by Doubleday. It was nominated for the 1980 National Book Award for hardcover science fiction, as well as both the British Fantasy and John W. Campbell Awards the same year. It was rewritten from Crowley's unpublished first novel, Learning to Live With It. It has been illustrated by Gary Friedman (1979) and Anne Yvonne Gilbert (1983).

== Plot summary ==
The novel takes the form of an oral history told by a young man named "Rush that Speaks" and of his wandering through a strange, post-apocalyptic world in pursuit of several seemingly incompatible goals. Each of the four divisions of his story are recorded on a separate crystal, and chapters correspond to facets of each crystal.

The story is set in a post-technological future; the present age is dimly remembered in story and legend, but without nostalgia or regret. The people of Rush's world are engaged in living their own lives in their own cultures. Words and artifacts from current time survive into Rush's age, suggesting that it is only a few millennia in the future. Yet there are hints that human society and even human biology are significantly changed. Even such basics as reproduction and eating have been altered, one by industrial-age genetic tampering, the other by contact with extraterrestrial life.

Rush comes of age in Little Belaire, a mazelike village of invisible, shifting boundaries, of secret paths and meandering stories and antique bric-a-brac carefully preserved in carved chests. The inhabitants are divided into clans called "cords" based on personality traits. Over the centuries, the people of Little Belaire have perfected an art which they call "truthful speaking": communication so clear and accurate, so "transparent", as to leave no potential for deception or misunderstanding. Perhaps as a result of this practice, Little Belaire appears to be free of any violence or even serious competition. Another result of truthful speaking is the existence of the "saints", those whose stories speak not only of the specifics of their own lives, but about the human condition. Yet even with the benefit of truthful speaking, secrets and mysteries remain.

Rush's journey is set in motion when the girl he loves, Once a Day, elopes from Little Belaire to join another group, an enigmatic society called Dr. Boots's List. In his search for her, Rush befriends a hermit and an "avvenger" and shares the secrets of the List. Ultimately he discovers a transparent sainthood stranger than any story told by the gossips of Little Belaire.

== Reception ==
Writing in the New York Times, Frederik Pohl praised Engine Summer, noting, "Mr. Crowley presents his society from the inside, yet his point of view is off‐center, so that the reader learns slowly and never feels secure enough in his knowledge to reduce everything to a glib formula or two. Far from being a didactic social treatise, the novel has strong, believable characters, an ingenious, well‐made plot, and a resolution that is intellectually and dramatically satisfying."

Greg Costikyan reviewed Engine Summer in Ares Magazine #3 and commented that "Engine Summer is pleasant and idyllic."

== List of principal characters ==
- Rush That Speaks – a truthful speaker of Palm Cord

First Crystal (Little Belaire)

- Once A Day – a Whisper Cord girl and Rush's great friend and beloved
- Speak A Word – Rush's mother
- Seven Hands – Rush's father
- So Spoken – Rush's grandmother
- Painted Red – Rush's first teacher

Second Crystal (with Blink)

- Blink - Rush's second teacher and possibly a saint
- Sewn Up, No Moon, Budding, Blooming – a family living by the river

Third Crystal (Dr Boot's List)

- Zhinsinura – Rush's third teacher
- Houd – leader of the trading party with whom Once A Day left Little Belaire
- Brom – a large intelligent cat

Fourth Crystal (Alone)

- Teeplee – an Avvenger and trader
- Mongolfier – a visitor from Laputa
