= Four Freedoms (disambiguation) =

Four Freedoms were the themes of Franklin Delano Roosevelt's 1941 State of the Union Address.

Four Freedoms may also refer to:

== Tributes to Franklin D. Roosevelt's 1941 State of the Union Address ==
- Four Freedoms (Norman Rockwell)
- Four Freedoms Award
- Four Freedoms Monument
- Four Freedoms Plaza
- Franklin D. Roosevelt Four Freedoms Park

== Other ==
- Four Economic Freedoms, a concept within economic integration to describe a single market or common market
  - Four freedoms of the European single market: free movement of goods, capital, services and persons
- Four Belgian constitutional Freedoms: free worship and culture, free press, free association and free choice of school system
- Four Freedoms (free software)
- Four Freedoms (novel), a 2009 historical novel by John Crowley
- "The Four Freedoms", a 1945 short story by Edward Newhouse
