= Peter Milton =

Peter Milton may refer to:

- Peter Milton (artist) (born 1930), colorblind American artist
- Peter Milton (politician) (1928–2009), Australian politician
- Peter Milton Walsh, Australian singer-songwriter and guitarist

== See also ==
- Peter Hilton (1923–2010), British mathematician
