= Four Freedoms (novel) =

2009 historical novel by John Crowley

- First Edition Cover by William Morrow Books
- Author: John Crowley
- Cover artist: Mary Schuck
- Language: English
- Subject: World War II
- Genre: Historical fiction
- Publisher: William Morrow
- Publication date: 26 May 2009 (1st edition)
- Publication place: United States
- Media type: Print
- Pages: 400 (Hardcover edition)
- ISBN: 978-0-06-123150-6

Four Freedoms is a 2009 historical novel by American writer John Crowley. It follows the adventures of several characters centering on a fictional aircraft manufacturing plant near Ponca City, Oklahoma during World War II, specifically from 1942 to 1945. The plant chiefly produces the fictional B-30 Pax bomber. It is Crowley's first novel after the completion of his Ægypt Sequence, and marks a turning in his style from the historically speculative series to historical realism.

The novel deals with the manufacturing and war industries during World War II, but rather than dealing with the most able-bodied during this period, the novel takes up the story of minority groups, the disabled, and many others still awaiting rights of full citizenship taking an active role in America. In his Afterword, Crowley explicitly theorizes that the period would strongly influence later civil movements in the United States:

For most of them, and for many of the African American men and women, Hispanics, Native Americans, and people with disabilities who also served, the end of the war meant returning to the status quo ante: but things could never be restored just as they had been, and the war years contained the seeds of change that would eventually grow again.

== Background ==
The novel's title is a reference to the Four Freedoms Speech given by Franklin D. Roosevelt in 1941. Critics have noted that the partially paralyzed President inhabits the novel in spirit (though not actually appearing). Crowley notes in his afterword that though the B-30 Pax bomber is a fictional creation, it bears striking resemblance to the real Convair B-36 "Peacemaker", which he was not aware of until he had already created the fictional bomber.

The novel's style is somewhat similar to that of Crowley's earlier novel Little, Big, with the story proper loosely narrated amid frequent narrative spurs to the various backstories of characters introduced working at the plant. It is implied by his dealings with Diane as well as with Vi that since conclusions of both women's backstories are given to Prosper, his instigation brought them about. Martha's story is explicitly instigated by Prosper, making the novel's structure itself a reflection of Prosper's empathy.

== Plot ==
While drafting plans for building an aeronautics plant, brothers Henry and Jules Van Damme are unable to justify removing workers from agrarian or armaments assembly support efforts for the War in Europe. A vice president at their company jokingly suggests "making do, with women, the coloreds, the oldsters, the defectives, the handicaps. Henry enthusiastically agrees telling his recruitment services, "Go out into the highways and the byways, bring in the lame, the halt, and the blind". Realizing that the planes will be completed after the end of the war, the brothers suggest instead of paying employees limited salaries due to the war effort, a city be built, Henryville, to accommodate every need of workers in the factory.

Prosper and Pancho shortly afterwards meet, Pancho deliberately seeking a pacifism in avoiding the draft, and Prosper recently having left the home of his aunts, May and Bea, to seek independence and avoid condescension of the disabled from his employers. Eventually Prosper meets Vi, whom he later unintentionally spurns with his relationship with Connie. The plant temporarily shuts down to commemorate the death of Roosevelt, and shortly after his death the Vice President of Labor announces that in making the transition to non-war industries, the first layoffs at plants like the one at Ponca will be the old, the women, and the disabled. Henryville begins to dissolve, and abandoned when ultimately destroyed by a tornado, resulting in no related casualties. The novel's ending depicts a somewhat prosperous Ponca City near the bulldozed remains of Henryville, with a few rusting B-30 Pax Bombers left in the fields nearby.

== Characters ==
- Prosper Olander - The novel's protagonist, is born with lordosis, made far worse by an attempt at corrective surgery. Despite this, he is incredibly able-minded, learning forgery by imitation, and finding the agency granted him by employers of the disabled to be both condescending and dishonest. Throughout the novel, he is shown to have a nearly superhuman capacity for empathy, especially towards the lives of women. Vi jokingly attributes this to his childhood love of the magazine True Story. His full name compromises a pun on the Shakespearean character Prospero.
- Pancho Notzing - Prosper's companion, and later coworker. Pancho is a devotee of Percy Shelley, referring to a copy of Prometheus Unbound he carries throughout the novel as "serving in ways as scripture". He is described by other characters as Utopian, but describes himself as "bestopian", at one point in the novel, enacting a scheme to form and ideal "Harmonious City", to ultimately see his plans crumble. His name is a reference to the Don Quixote character, though not pronounced the same way.
- Violet "Vi" Harbison - Prosper's chief love interest throughout the novel. She arrives at the Henryville plant after the cattle on her father's ranch are slaughtered due to a government quarantine. She plays pitcher for the company baseball team.
- Al and Sal Mass - A married couple, both with dwarfism, that work at the plant assembling fuselages. They are nicknamed The Teenie Weenies by other members of the shop after a newspaper cartoon of the same name.
- Connie Wrobleski - A married woman who comes to Henryville looking for her husband Bunce. Prosper's empathetic attention to her unintentionally spurns Vi and inflames the anger of Bunce. Her son is named Adolph after his paternal grandfather, for which Connie often suffers discrimination.
- Diane - A floor manager who comes to be the friend of Connie. Prosper ultimately impregnates her, despite her being married to a soldier in the war.
- Henry and Jules Van Damme - The two sons of the prosperous and technically inclined businessman Eudoxe Van Damme. Inspired in their boyhood by their father's enthusiasm for the first crewed flights, the boys are among the first

== Reception ==
In a review for The New York Times, Max Byrd warmly welcomed the novel, assuring those who had enjoyed Crowley's fantasy works that the genre of Historical Fiction allowed Crowley to further develop his style of metaphor in simple details of ordinary life. Along similar lines, in The Washington Post, Bill Sheehan posited that what makes Crowley unique as a novelist is not only his metaphoric detail, but the extremely high level of craft apparent in the work, especially with concern to historical accuracy.

Women's Issues writer Linda Lowen in a review at About.com, praised the novel for its depictions of women's contribution domestically to the war effort, without sacrificing integrity of characterization for the sake of an empathetic depiction. She did, however, note that the reader may find some of the women's stories tedious, despite being realistic, possibly having been written in the style of the magazine True Story that is frequently referenced.

Robert Wiersema praised the novel as well, in a review for The Globe and Mail, enucleate that the novel is built on the state of Henryville being essentially of suspended judgement, allowing characters to speak of their most common humanity. He went further to suggest that Crowley gone beyond an author of excellent style, to one who readers have come to trust.
