= Ægypt =

Series of four fantasy novels by John Crowley

Ægypt is a fantasy tetralogy written by American author John Crowley. The series describes the life and work of Pierce Moffett, a history professor who prepares a manuscript for publication even as it prepares him for some as-yet unknown destiny, all set amidst strange and subtle Hermetic manipulations among the Faraway Hills at the border of New York, New Jersey and Pennsylvania.

== Volumes ==
Title	Year	Notes
The Solitudes	1987	Originally published in 1987 as Ægypt, despite Crowley's objections. Revised 2007. World Fantasy Award nominee, 1988; Arthur C. Clarke Award nominee, 1988
Love & Sleep	1994	World Fantasy Award nominee, 1995
Dæmonomania	2000	
Endless Things	2007	Locus Fantasy Award nominee, 2008

The four volumes deal with Moffett's real and dream life in the United States in 1977 (and, in an extended coda, into the early 1980s) with the narrative of the manuscript he is preparing for publication. Another manuscript, left unfinished by its author Fellowes Kraft and discovered by Moffett, is an historical fiction that follows the briefly intersecting adventures of Italian heretic Giordano Bruno and of British occultists John Dee and Edward Kelley.

Moffett is trained as a historian, and is under contract to write a popular history covering hermetical themes. Early in the process, he conceives of writing a novel which, it is clear, would be Ægypt; his ruminations on that novel describe the structure of the novel he is in. The distinctions between Crowley's, Moffett's, and Kraft's books are continually elided and the three books are finally undifferentiated.

The novels generally have three main "strands" reflecting on three main characters, one occurring in the present day generally following Pierce or Rosie Mucho in their artistic works, and two occurring in the Renaissance following the fictionalized historical activities of John Dee, Edward Kelley and Giordano Bruno as written by Fellowes Kraft. The difference is marked stylistically by dashes indicating dialogue for events that happened in the Renaissance and events in the twentieth century marked by dialogue in ordinary English quotation marks.

== Sources and structure ==
The titles of the first three volumes in the sequence are tributes to Renaissance literary works; and in many cases the nature of these works redound on the action of these three novels themselves:

- The title and some of the plot of the first volume is related to Luis de Góngora's Las Soledades, or The Solitudes.
- Francesco Colonna's Hypnerotomachia Poliphili, or Poliphilo's Strife of Love in a Dream.
- The title of the second volume is shared with a poem by Algernon Charles Swinburne titled "Love and Sleep".
- Jean Bodin's De la démonomanie des sorciers, or The Satanic Possession of Witches.
- The title of the fourth volume repeats a complaining phrase often spoken by the author of the manuscript that Moffett prepares for publication. It probably alludes to the title and subject matter of Giordano Bruno's De innumerabilibus, immenso et infigurabili ("Of innumerable things, vastness and the unrepresentable").

The sequence is organized around the twelve astrological houses, with each book divided into three parts, each bearing a Latin name of the corresponding house. The Solitudes' parts, for example, are called "Vita", "Lucrum" and "Fratres", the Latin names for the first, second and third houses. The content of each part bears some relationship to the traditional associations of the house in question. The four volumes themselves correspond to the four seasons, starting with spring and ending in winter.

== Reception ==
American literary critic Harold Bloom praised the first three books in the sequence, installing the first two in his 1993 list of the Western canon. Michael Dirda, asked in 2007 what his favorite recent book was, named "the four-part sequence by John Crowley called 'Aegypt.'" On reviewing the completed sequence in 2008, Dirda declared that the four novels together "confirms that he is one of our finest living writers, period." In an appreciation of Crowley's Little, Big in 2000, James Hynes called the then-unfinished sequence "an astonishing accomplishment" comparing it to works by Robertson Davies and Thomas Mann.

Terri Windling selected Love and Sleep as one of the best fantasy books of 1994, saying "his growing story is a masterpiece."

== See also ==
- Ron Drummond
