= Great Work of Time =

1989 science fiction novella

- Cover of the stand-alone edition (1991)
- Author: John Crowley
- Genre: Science fiction; Novella
- Publisher: Bantam Books
- ISBN: 978-0-553-29319-7

"Great Work of Time" is a science fiction novella by American writer John Crowley, originally published in Crowley's 1989 book collection Novelty. A story involving time travel, it concerns a secret society whose aim is to avert World War I to preserve and expand the British Empire.

== Plot ==
Caspar Last uses his newly created time machine to travel to 19th-century British Guiana to obtain the very rare British Guiana 1c magenta stamp. Last plans to sell the stamp, reap the profits, and never again use time travel or let it be used by others. A shadowy group called the Otherhood buys his stamp and takes control of the time machine, which it wishes to use to preserve the existence of the British Empire. In the new timeline, the British Empire survives as a dominant world power throughout the 20th century.

Denys Winterset, a promising young official in the Colonial Service in Africa in the 1950s, travels the Cape to Cairo Railway, where he meets a mysterious stranger, and is invited to join the Otherhood. Winterset is told that he must travel back to the beginning of the group in 1893 and assassinate its founder Cecil Rhodes. Otherwise, in the late 1890s, Rhodes will change his will and dissipate much of his fortune, the Otherhood will never come into being, and the original timeline will be restored.

In another timeline, a different manifestation of Winterset travels into the future, even though such travel had been forbidden by the Otherhood. There, he learns that excessive tinkering with the timelines has generated countless unintended changes. The citizens of this world ask Winterset to go back, prevent the previous Winterset from killing Rhodes, and restore the "true" timeline.

Meanwhile, the other Winterset has arrived in 1893 Cape Town and has no difficulty in gaining Rhodes's trust. At the moment of opportunity, a mysterious force, implied to be the future Winterset, prevents Winterset from pulling the trigger. The mission fails and traps Winterset in the past. Winterset enters the service of Rhodes and witnesses first-hand the ugly and brutal side of Rhodes's independent colony-building. Later on, Winterset can only watch helplessly as "The Original Situation" reasserts itself, the world is convulsed by two World Wars, and the second one is followed by the breakup of the British Empire.

In the final chapter, Winterset, a young man, now living in the "true" 20th-century history, enters the Colonial Service, now a doomed institution, with the Empire's colonies being ceded to new independent nations in Africa. He meets his older self in 1956 in Africa and learns of the truth of time travel. He helps his older self escape from Africa amid the chaos and returns to London, where the story ends with their last meeting many years later.

Winterset notes in The Times newspaper "the sale of the single known example of the 1856 magenta British Guiana" stamp, known to have been owned in 1956 by the Otherhood, and realises that time travel means that his story is still vulnerable to being rewritten.

== Analysis ==
As noted by the critic Susan Young:

Great Work of Time has the same basic outline as Isaac Asimov's The End of Eternity - i.e. a secret society of well-meaning time travelers bent on remodeling history, and a young man recruited into the society in order to make a specific change that would bring this society itself into being. The details of what the time travelers do and where in time they operate are much different from those in Asimov's book. However, in both books, the society's operations come to a halt through the influence of people from the future, because the society's actions endanger the existence of the future.

== Awards ==
The story won the World Fantasy Award for Best Novella in 1990.

== Publication history ==
- Novelty: Four Stories, 1989
- The Great Work of Time, 1991, publisher: Spectra, ISBN 0-553-29319-2
- Novelties & Souvenirs: Collected Short Fiction, 2004, publisher: Harper Perennial, ISBN 978-0-380-73106-0
- A Science Fiction Omnibus, 2007, edited by Brian Aldiss, publisher: Penguin books, ISBN 978-0-14-118892-8
