= The Deep (Crowley novel) =

1975 novel by John Crowley

- Cover of the first edition, published by Doubleday. Cover art by John Cayea.
- Author: John Crowley
- Language: English
- Publisher: Doubleday
- Publication date: 1975
- ISBN: 0-385-09098-6 (first edition)
- Dewey Decimal: 813.54
- LC Class: PZ4.C9533 De

The Deep is a 1975 speculative fiction novel by American writer John Crowley, who described it as being "based quite closely on events in the English Wars of the Roses". The novel is set in a medieval world where the two factions, the "Reds" and the "Blacks", struggle for supremacy through battle.

== Plot ==
A visitor arrives in the conflict between the two factions, the "Reds" and the "Blacks". It soon becomes apparent that he (it) is only superficially human. Damaged in a skirmish between Protectors and the Just at the start, he and we spend the rest of the book finding out how and why he was made and sent. Early, Fauconred quotes their book: "the world is founded on a pillar which is founded on the Deep". This turns out to be true.

Whilst a war of succession plays out, the visitor becomes secretary, then recorder; and travels to the edge of the world to meet Leviathan, an immemorial creature who built the world to shelter his sleep from the heaven stones. Meanwhile, the slow stable world which has been immortal because repeating for uncounted years begins to spiral into the unknown path of development.

== Reception ==
Critics Brian W. Aldiss and David Wingrove praised The Deep as "a remarkable first novel, well written and darkly true to human nature." They described it as "a complex novel of many layers [whose] people live and breathe and die horribly in [its] pages.
