= RH (company) =

American home furnishings company

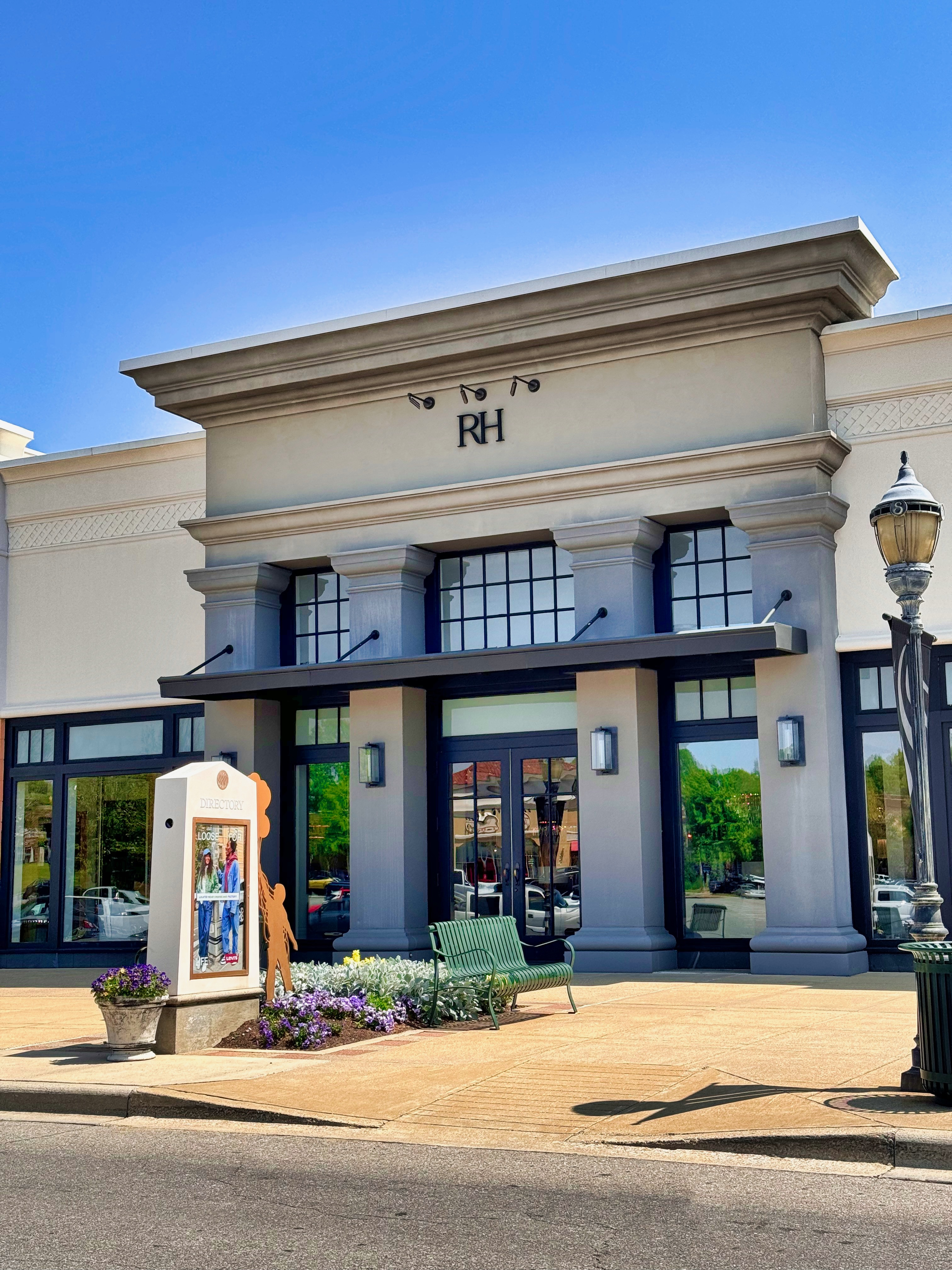
- RH location at The Summit (Alabama)
- Formerly: Restoration Hardware (1979–2012)
- Type: Public
- Traded as: NYSE: RH; S&P 400 component
- Industry: Retail
- Founded: 1979; 47 years ago in Eureka, California, United States
- Founder: Stephen Gordon
- Headquarters: Corte Madera, California, United States, since 1995; 31 years ago
- Number of locations: 84 (2024)
- Key people: Gary Friedman (Chairman and CEO)
- Products: Home furnishings
- Revenue: ▼US$3.03 billion (2023)
- Operating income: ▼US$366 million (2023)
- Net income: ▼US$128 million (2023)
- Total assets: ▼US$4.14 billion (2023)
- Total equity: ▼US$−297 million (2023)
- Number of employees: 5,960 (2024)
- Website: rh.com

RH (formerly Restoration Hardware) is an American home furnishings company headquartered in Corte Madera, California. The company sells its merchandise through its retail stores, catalog, and online. As of August 2018, the company operated a total of 70 galleries, 18 full-line design galleries, and 3 baby-and-child galleries. The company also has 36 outlet stores in the United States and Canada.

== History ==
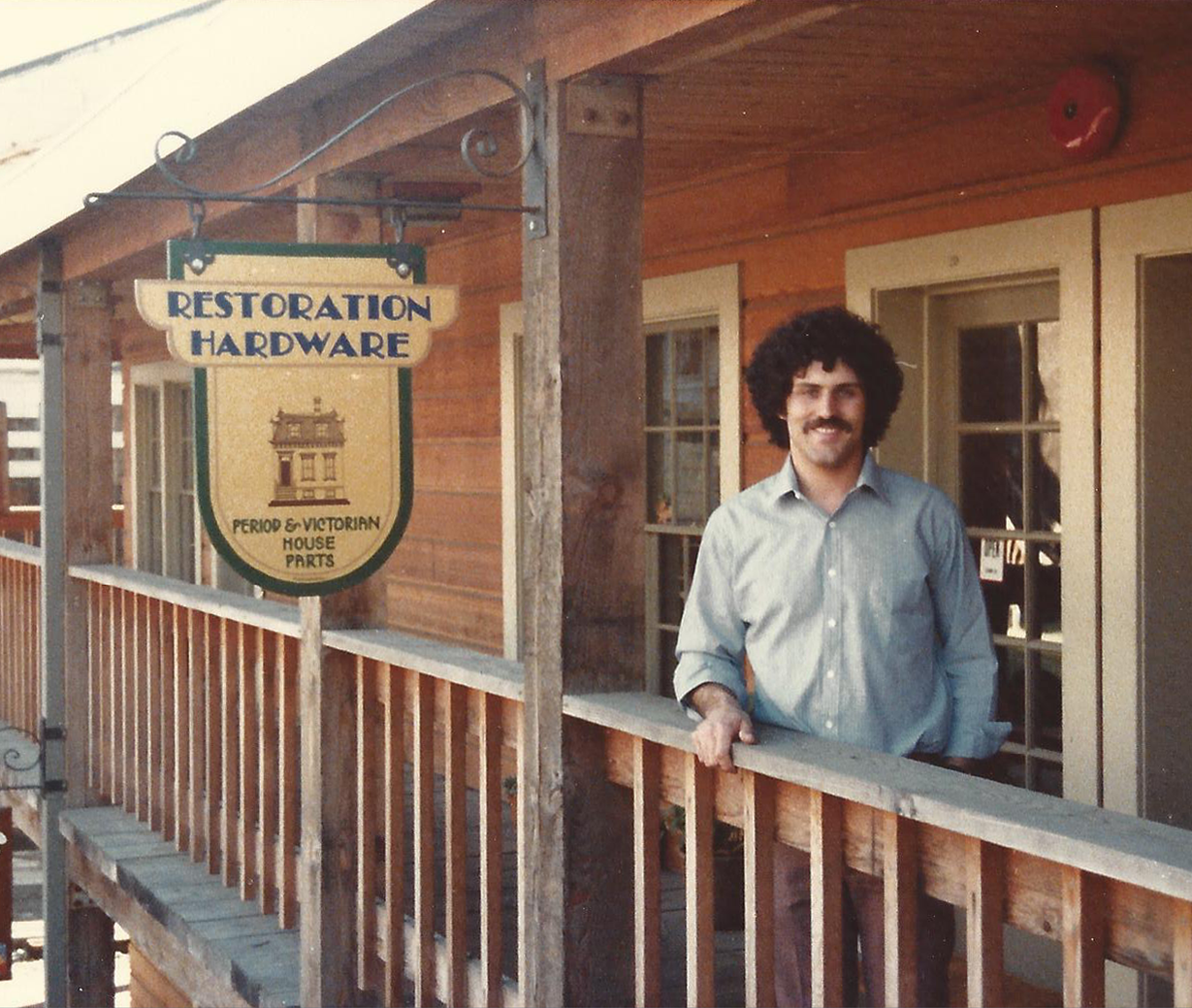
Stephen Gordon, founder of Restoration Hardware at the original Eureka, California, headquarters in 1981.

Stephen Gordon founded Restoration Hardware in Eureka, California, in 1979 while restoring a Victorian home and finding affordable, high-quality hardware and fixtures unavailable. The company expanded slowly in Northern California and Boston before raising outside capital from Cardinal Investments which allowed it to accelerate its expansion. The company had 47 stores when it went public in 1998, ending the year at over 65 stores. It then expanded to over 100 stores in 31 states, with $369.5 million in net sales by 2001.

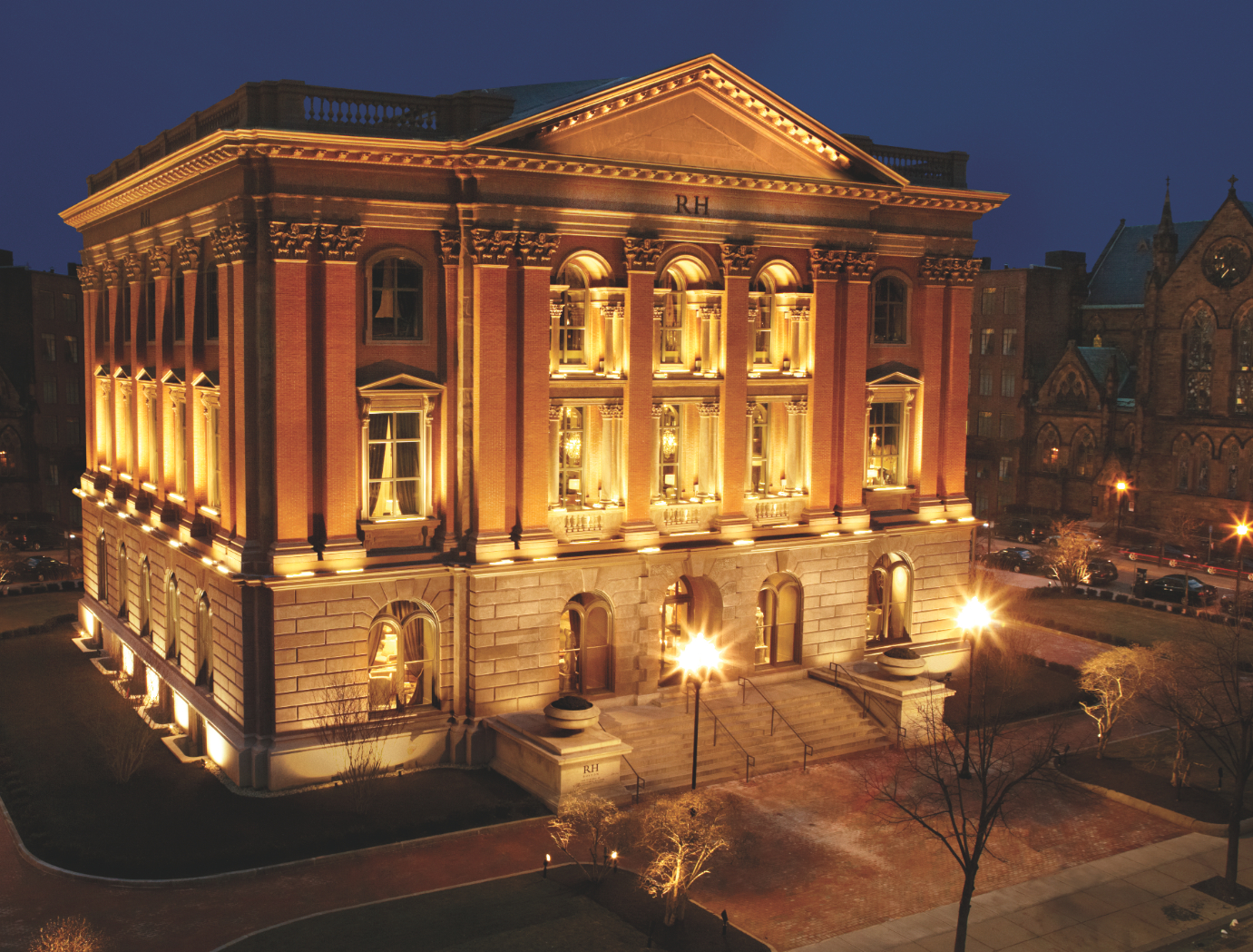
Restoration Hardware location in the former Museum of Natural History building, Boston

In 2001, Gary Friedman joined the company from Williams-Sonoma as Chief Executive Officer after being passed over for the CEO position at Williams-Sonoma by Howard Lester. Restoration Hardware's sales were waning and the company was seeking additional capital. In 2005, Gordon left the company in order to take over as CEO of Robert Redford's Sundance Catalog Company. In 2007, Sears Holdings Corporation purchased 13.7% of the share of Restoration Hardware, prompting speculation that Sears might attempt a full takeover. After the United States housing bubble burst, the company was slated to close two stores in 2008, including the original store located in Old Town Eureka, and open one in Canada. In June 2008, the company completed the transaction without Sears Holding, but instead with Catterton Partners.

Catterton took Restoration Holdings private on June 18, 2008. That year, the company also launched its baby-and-child line. In 2012, Restoration Hardware underwent an initial public offering, trading at $24 a share at its opening. The company was renamed RH, and trades on the New York Stock Exchange under the symbol RH. In 2007, about 65% of the company's products were made outside the US, particularly from contract manufacturers in southern China. The company is the largest importer of Belgian Linen in the United States.

RH created a small spaces line in 2012, composed of furnishings scaled down for smaller living spaces. The 2014 Small Spaces source book depicts 18 different smaller-scale homes in the United States and Europe. In 2013, RH also released the Objects of Curiosity source book, showing character pieces, artifacts, and unique décor. The tableware line was released in 2013.

In 2012, the company was accused of copying the designs of other companies, specifically those used for the US military. On March 7, 2013, RH opened a gallery in Boston's Back Bay in an 1864 brick and brownstone structure at 234 Berkeley Street. In May 2013, the company announced a multichannel RH contemporary art platform when it acquired the first edition of Rain Room by Random International with exclusive showing rights in North America. RH loaned Rain Room to the Museum of Modern Art in New York for the U.S. premier of EXPO 1: New York from mid-May through July 2013. In 2014, RH opened a 70,000 square foot store which Atlanta magazine called RH's "next-generation full-line design gallery", which includes amenities like a 50-foot infinite pool.

RH operates six stores in Canada: one full-line design gallery at Yorkdale Shopping Centre in Toronto, three galleries and two outlets.

In February 2023, it was reported that D1 Capital Partners owns 7.4% of RH.

== Source books ==
Time magazine was critical of the company for its large catalog called the "Source Book" for its length (992 pages), specifically its waste of paper. The full 2014 catalogue weighed 17 pounds (7.7 kg) and had over 3000 pages. The company stated that by combining all of the different sourcebooks into one package it reduced their carbon footprint, while critics still stated that the volume of paper used for the publication's mass delivery was wasteful.

== Design philosophy ==
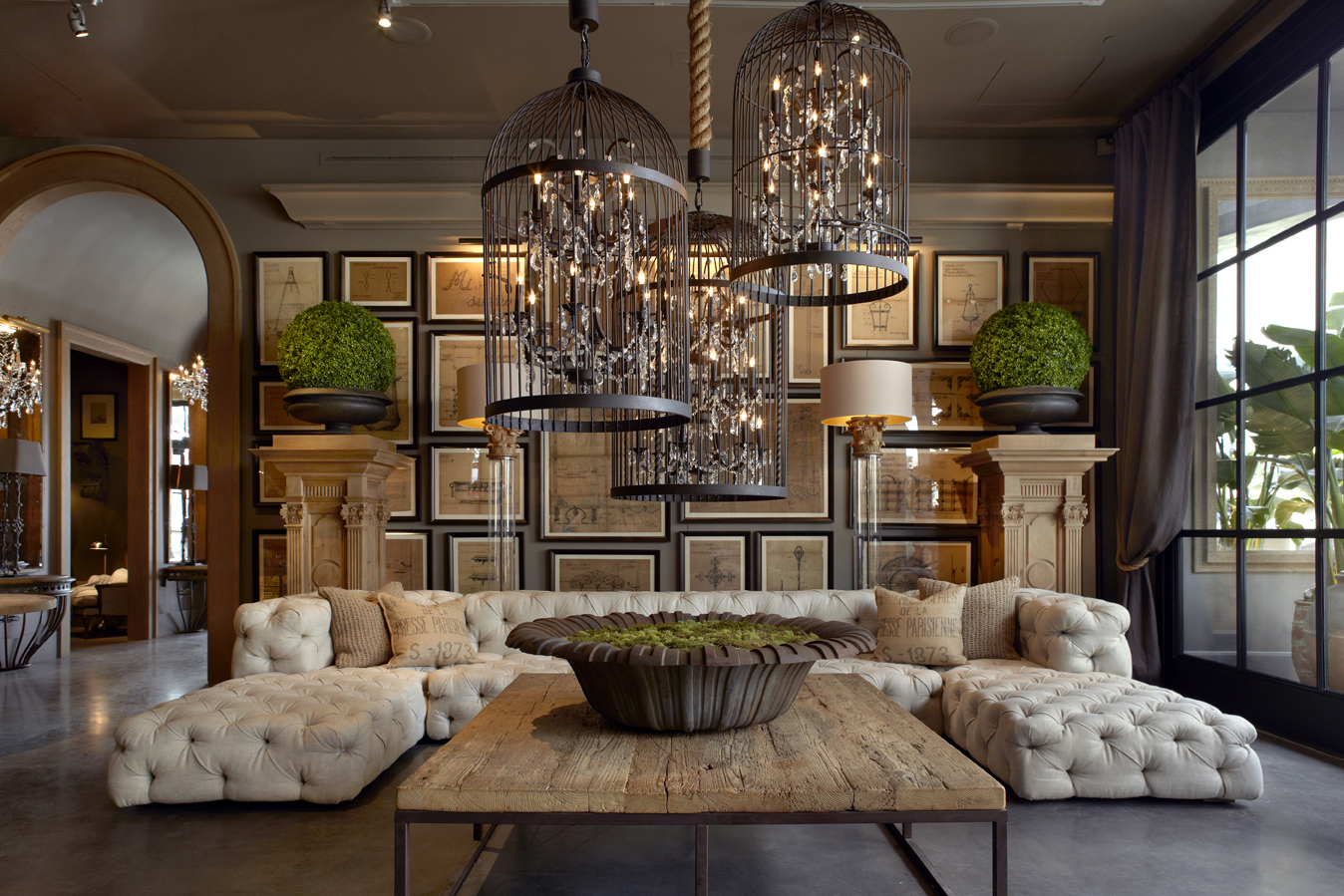
Restoration Hardware Gallery in Las Vegas

As of September 2010, company representatives declared a change in focus for the company. In an attempt to go further "up-market", the company has focused itself on furniture gallery offerings at higher price points to distinguish itself from competitors like Pottery Barn. Locations have begun adding the term "Gallery" to their marques to indicate the change. The company designs, markets, and sells its collections through its retail stores, source books, and online. The San Francisco Chronicle has reported that, "One of the key strategies that set RH apart is its approach to inventory. While most retailers design things in-house, RH created a different model. RH CEO Gary Friedman said, "We have one full-time designer, Suzi Bolognese, working directly from London on our catalogs and displays." The company has partnered with artisans and designers in the production of its lines.

Jim Cramer of CNBC said that RH's source books were a tactic to move past the "four walls of the web" and to make it "exciting for people to shop again". He also stated that RH is a market disruptor, often to the point that it "disrupts itself". Cramer said in 2014 that the company was reinventing the concept of the brick and mortar store, including the use of very large flagship stores in unusual locations. In 2024, CEO Friedman, told Cramer that the company had no official social media presence at all, expressing a distaste for influencer marketing and social media marketing campaigns as inauthentic.

== Hospitality concepts ==
In 2015, RH opened its first hospitality concept, the 3 Arts Club Café in Chicago. Since then, fifteen additional outlets were opened in the U.S., U.K., and Canada. RH operates 14 restaurants inside of select RH Gallery locations.

In 2022, RH opened its first hotel, the RH Guesthouse, in New York City.

In April 2022, it was announced that RH would purchase and renovate the Linden House, the home of the late Christel DeHaan, in Indianapolis, Indiana into a store showroom and restaurant. In November 2023, grand opening plans to the public were announced for November 17, 2023. The estate includes a 41,762-square-foot mansion, a private lake, terraces, and formal gardens. There are seven bedrooms and 10 full bathrooms, plus seven half-bathrooms in the house built in 2007.

In June 2023, the company entered the European market, opening its first location outside of North America. 'The Gallery at Aynho Park', based at Aynhoe Park in Northamptonshire, United Kingdom. It features six hospitality concepts and is located on 73 acres of land. The property features three restaurants (the Orangery, the Loggia, and the Conservatory), and three beverage outlets (the Wine Lounge, the Tea Lounge, and the Juicery).

== Executives ==
Gary Friedman was the company's chairman and co-chief executive officer from 2001 until his resignation in 2012 following an independent report from Weil, Gotshal & Manges into his inappropriate romantic relationship with a younger female employee. Following his dismissal, Friedman continued the relationship with the woman. He was reappointed as co-CEO and chairman in July 2013. The company also announced that concurrent with Friedman's appointment, RH acquired the exclusive right to develop Hierarchy and that the new concept would be rebranded as RH Atelier, focusing on the development of luxury apparel, accessories, footwear, and jewelry.

Carlos Alberini joined as co-CEO in 2010, but resigned in 2013 to accept a position as CEO of Lucky Brand Jeans, upon which Friedman became the chairman and CEO of the company.
