= Incunabula (publisher) =

Incunabula was a small press originally based in Seattle, Washington, United States, operated under the sole proprietorship of Ron Drummond.

Between 1992 and 1996, Incunabula published three books and one broadside: They Fly at Çiron by Samuel R. Delany (July 1993); Antiquities: Seven Stories by John Crowley (October 1993); "Solutions to Everything" by Michael Ventura (broadside; September 1994); and Atlantis: Three Tales by Samuel R. Delany (July 1995).

The company released a 25th anniversary edition of Crowley's World Fantasy Award-winning 1981 novel, Little, Big, at the end of 2022.
