= Peter Milton (artist) =

American artist (1930–2026)

Peter Winslow Milton (April 2, 1930 - March 12, 2026) was a colorblind American artist who was diagnosed with deuteranopia after hearing a comment about the pink in his landscapes.

Milton's black and white etchings and engravings often display photorealistic detail with a visionary aesthetic. His themes include architecture, history, myth, and memory, and their intersections and hidden juxtapositions. They often compress long periods into a single moment, as in "Family Reunion" and "The Train from Munich."

Milton received his MFA from Yale University in 1961. His work has been exhibited in most major museums in the U.S. and Europe, including the Metropolitan Museum of Art and the Museum of Modern Art, New York, the British Museum and the Tate Gallery, London, and the Bibliothèque Nationale, Paris. Two major book collections of his work have been published: The Primacy of Touch: The Drawings of Peter Milton (New York: Hudson Hills Press, 1993) and Peter Milton: Complete Prints 1960-1996 (San Francisco: Chronicle Books, 1996).

In its 2023 hardcover edition, the novel Little, Big by John Crowley (author) included eighty Peter Milton illustrations (as snippets taken from fifteen prior art works) and an appendix discussing Milton's work
