= Beasts (Crowley novel) =

1976 novel by John Crowley

- First ed. cover
- Author: John Crowley
- Cover artist: John Cayea
- Language: English
- Genre: Science fiction
- Publisher: Doubleday
- Publication date: 1976 (first edition)
- Publication place: United States
- Media type: Print
- ISBN: 0385112602
- OCLC: 731182754

Beasts is a novel by American writer John Crowley, published in 1976 by Doubleday.

== Plot summary ==
Beasts describes a world in which genetically engineered animals are given a variety of human characteristics. Painter is a leo, a combination of man and lion. Reynard, a character derived from medieval European fable, is part fox.

Political forces result in the leos being deemed an experimental failure, first resigned to reservations, and later to be hunted down and eliminated. A central element of the story is the relationship between Painter and Reynard, who acts as a kingmaker behind the scenes.

== Reception ==
The New York Times reviewer Gerald Jonas praised Crowley's "prodigious inventiveness", describing the novel as "a memorable tale that ends too soon."

Dave Langford reviewed Beasts for White Dwarf #60, and stated that "a strange story of genetically engineered man/beast hybrids who are greater than the sum of their genes. This one's a bit young for canonization [1976], but it's a fine book."

Brian W. Aldiss and David Wingrove reported that "for all the poetry in Crowley's writing, Beasts treats its subject matter in a realistic mode that gives the book a resonance and a relevance it might otherwise have lacked."

Dave Langford reviewed Beasts for White Dwarf #99, and stated that "The slightest of Crowley's works? I recant: anything by him demands to be read and reread."
