= Soledades =

Spanish poem by Luis de Góngora

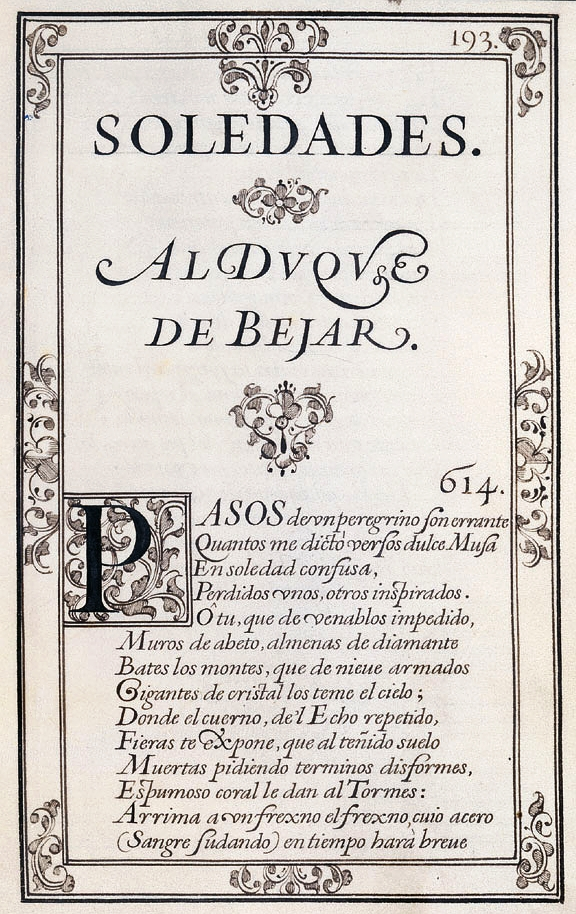
First page of Las soledades (Chacon Manuscript, I, 193).

Las Soledades (Solitudes) is a poem by Luis de Góngora, composed in 1613 in silva (Spanish strophe) in hendecasyllables (lines of eleven syllables) and heptasyllables (seven syllables).

Góngora intended to divide the poem in four parts that were to be called "Soledad de los campos" (Solitude of the fields), "Soledad de las riberas" (Solitude of the riverbanks), "Soledad de las selvas" (Solitude of the forests), and "Soledad del yermo" (Solitude of the wasteland).

Góngora only wrote the "dedicatoria al Duque de Béjar" (dedication to the Duke of Béjar) and the first two Soledades, the second of which remained unfinished. However, some critics like John Beverley propose that the "unfinished" ending can be read as a literary technique that suggests a connection with the beginning of the poem.

From the time of its composition, Soledades inspired a great debate regarding the difficulty of its language and its mythological and erudite references without an apparent didactic purpose. It was attacked by the Count of Salinas and Juan Martínez de Jáuregui y Aguilar (who composed an Antidote against the Soledades). The work, however, was defended by Salcedo Coronel, José Pellicer, Francisco Fernández de Córdoba (Abad de Rute), the Count of Villamediana, Gabriel Bocángel, and overseas, Juan de Espinosa Medrano and Juana Inés de la Cruz.

Rafael Alberti would later add his own Soledad tercera (Paráfrasis incompleta)

The first novel of John Crowley's Aegypt series is named The Solitudes and the Góngora poem is read by the protagonist, and is referenced throughout the plot.

== English translations ==
- The Solitudes of Don Luis De Gongora (1931) English, Spanish, Book edition: translated into English verse by Edward Meryon Wilson. Published by Gordon Fraser, Cambridge: The Minority Press, 1931. 80 pages. Referenced Dámaso Sr. Alonso's 1927 text of "Las Soledades", published by the Revista de occidenta., Occidenta Magazine, Madrid.--p. xviii. 80 pages
- The Solitudes of Don Luis De Gongora (1965) Translated by Edward Meryon Wilson, London: Cambridge University Press.
- The Solitudes of Luis De Gongora (1968) Translated by Gilbert F. Cunningham, Baltimore: The Johns Hopkins Press.
- Luis De Gongora: Soledades (1997) Translated by Philip Polack, London: Bristol Classical Press.
- The Solitudes (2011) Translated by Edith Grossman, New York: Penguin Books. ISBN 978-0143106388
