= Flint and Mirror =

2022 fantasy novel by John Crowley

- Author: John Crowley
- Audio read by: Samuel Roukin
- Genre: Historical fantasy
- Publisher: Tor Books
- Publication date: 2022
- Pages: 256

Flint and Mirror: A Novel of History and Magic is a 2022 historical fantasy novel by John Crowley, retelling the life of Hugh O'Neill, Earl of Tyrone from a magical viewpoint. An expansion of Crowley's 2018 short story of the same name, it was first published by Tor Books.

== Synopsis ==
The night before he goes to England for the first time, Hugh O'Neill receives a magical piece of flint from the Tuatha Dé Danann, so that he may call upon them in times of need; later, he receives from John Dee a magical obsidian mirror, which will connect him to Queen Elizabeth. Ultimately, however, neither magical artifact makes a difference.

== Reception ==
In The Spectator, Philip Womack stated that it was "engrossing and elegant". Publishers Weekly found it to be "beautiful (and) subtle", lauding Crowley's "[r]ich, evocative prose" and comparing the novel to Jonathan Strange and Mister Norrell.

The Historical Novel Society praised Crowley's "beautiful" writing and "fascinating, well-crafted history", but observed that the novel's magical elements do not feel "essential" or "consequential", as "despite suggestions that [the flint and mirror] might allow [O'Neill] to summon mythical allies to his aid or spy on his enemies," he is never shown as "wield[ing] these powers in [a] meaningful fashion", asking whether the novel should instead have been "straight historical fiction". Similarly, Library Journal noted that, despite Crowley's "enthrall[ing] (...) alchemy of uncanny magic, ancient science, and tragic history", the novel may disappoint those who seek "the high magic of epic fantasy".

At Locus, Paul Di Filippo called it "not quite as monumental as some of Crowley’s earlier works, but [nonetheless] utterly captivating and satisfying, exhibiting all his trademark literary craft, as well as his deep perceptiveness about life, time, nature and the universe," drawing parallels to the works of Morgan Llywelyn, Guy Gavriel Kay, T. H. White, and Hal Foster, and suggesting that the "deeply affecting subplot" about the relationship between Ineen and the shapeshifting Sorley could have succeeded as a standalone story.
