= Ka – Dar Oakley in the Ruin of Ymr =

2017 fantasy novel

Ka: Dar Oakley in the Ruin of Ymr
- First edition cover
- Author: John Crowley
- Cover artist: Sonia Chaghatzbanian
- Language: English
- Genre: Fantasy, Magical realism, Historical fiction
- Publisher: Saga Press (Simon & Schuster)
- Publication date: October 24, 2017
- Pages: 464
- ISBN: 978-1-4814-9559-2

Ka: Dar Oakley in the Ruin of Ymr is a fantasy novel by American author John Crowley, published on October 24, 2017, by Saga Press, an imprint of Simon & Schuster. The novel follows Dar Oakley, who is described as the first crow in all of crow history to possess a name of his own, born approximately two thousand years ago, as he recounts his lives and deaths across human history to a contemporary narrator. In the crow language depicted in the novel, "Ka" refers to the spiritual realm of crows, while "Ymr" is the crow word for the human world (Earth).

The book is widely considered one of Crowley's most ambitious works, described by the Los Angeles Times as "a beautiful, often dreamlike late masterpiece." It was nominated for the World Fantasy Award for Best Novel in 2018.

== Plot ==
The novel is structured as a frame narrative. In the contemporary present, a dying elderly man (the unnamed narrator) who encounters an injured crow, Dar Oakley, during a period of environmental collapse and climate change. As the crow tells his life story in Ka (crow language), the narrator transcribes and translates it for human readers, acting as an intermediary between the corvid world and human experience.

Dar Oakley's story begins in prehistoric Europe before the arrival of humans in his territory. A medicine woman named Fox Cap becomes his first significant human companion: she teaches him to speak and understand her language and gives him his name. She later leads him into her people's spirit world, where he obtains a form of immortality: not true deathlessness, but rather the ability to wake again in a later era after dying, gradually recovering memories of his past lives. The novel is divided into three main sections corresponding to the lives Dar Oakley remembers: "Dar Oakley in the Coming of Ymr", "Dar Oakley and the Saints", and "Dar Oakley in the New World."

Subsequent chapters follow Dar Oakley through different periods of human history. He accompanies an Irish monk he knows only as Brother on a pilgrimage across the westernmost islands of Ireland and eventually to North America, echoing the legends of Brendan the Navigator. A pivotal section is set during the American Civil War, where Dar Oakley befriends Anna Kuhn, a woman who loses her husband and brother-in-law in the conflict. Faren Miller, writing in Locus, noted that the character boldly reimagines aspects of Emily Dickinson as a war widow and mystic spiritualist. She subsequently loses her sight but gains uncanny perceptive abilities, and, through some transference from the crow, becomes a prominent spiritualist medium.

The novel's prologue, echoed at its close, presents a vision of ragged humans scavenging a landfill while the elderly narrator lies dying, framing the entire narrative within an environmental and civilizational twilight, the titular "ruin of Ymr."

== Characters ==
- Dar Oakley: The novel's protagonist and the first crow in crow history to bear an individual name. Born roughly two thousand years ago, Dar Oakley dies and is reborn across the centuries, retaining fragmentary memories of previous lives.
- Fox Cap: A prehistoric medicine woman and Dar Oakley's first major human companion. She teaches him human language, grants him his name, and leads him into the underworld of her people, where he acquires his unusual form of immortality.
- The Brother: An Irish monk (never named) who accompanies Dar Oakley on a westward pilgrimage from Ireland across the Atlantic in search of the Paradise of the Saints.
- Anna Kuhn: A Civil War-era woman who loses family members in the conflict, subsequently loses her sight, and through a connection with Dar Oakley becomes a spiritualist medium with extraordinary perceptive faculties.
- The narrator: A contemporary, unnamed elderly man who encounters Dar Oakley during a period of personal grief and deteriorating health. He acts as translator and intermediary, and is instinctively identified by readers with Crowley himself.

== Themes ==
Central to the novel are the linked themes of death and storytelling. Christie Yant, writing in Lightspeed Magazine, described it as "a fable, a lullaby, a naturalist's guide to crows, and a peek at a hidden world just beyond our senses." Amy Goldschlager, reviewing the audiobook edition in Locus, characterised it as "a spiritual and philosophical work" that returns to the same tale in layered variations, building meaning through accumulation rather than conventional plot.

Crowley uses Dar Oakley's deliberately simple corvid perspective, focused on food, shelter, mates, and flock, to cast human civilization at a critical remove. Rather than offering authorial commentary on human violence, this detachment allows readers to draw their own conclusions about the human penchant for destruction and the meaning of the life cycle.

Environmental degradation and the death of the human world constitute another major strand of the novel. The contemporary frame narrative, set during ongoing climate change, encloses the historical episodes in a pervasively elegiac tone, a quality reviewers have noted as characteristic of Crowley's fiction more broadly. Faren Miller observed in Locus that the prologue invokes post-apocalyptic science fiction, depicting a chaotic future in which plants no longer follow the seasons, species have vanished, and disease ranges unchecked.

== Composition ==
Ka has been characterised as Crowley's attempt to write a more accessible novel than his dense middle-period works, while remaining fully within his signature aesthetic of lyrical, contemplative, and thematically ambitious prose. The cover art was created by Sonia Chaghatzbanian. Crowley himself narrated the audiobook edition, published by Brilliance Audio in October 2017 (ISBN 978-1-5436-1416-9).

== Critical reception ==
Critical response to Ka was generally positive, with particular praise for Crowley's prose style. The Los Angeles Times called it "a beautiful, often dreamlike late masterpiece," while novelist Peter Straub described Crowley as "one of our country's absolutely finest novelists." Gary K. Wolfe reviewed the novel in Locus #681 (October 2017), and Faren Miller followed with a review in Locus #682 (November 2017), concluding that readers "won't regret" exploring the novel. John Clute reviewed it in Strange Horizons on 20 November 2017, and Christie Yant contributed a review to Lightspeed Magazine in April 2018, noting with surprise that the novel had not appeared on the Nebula Award shortlist despite what she regarded as its exceptional quality. Paul Di Filippo also reviewed it in The Speculator in 2018.

Some critics noted the novel's demanding pace and structural diffuseness. Liz Bourke, reviewing for Reactor (formerly Tor.com), described it as the most baffling novel she could remember reading, finding it difficult to identify a unifying argument across its chronologically distinct sections. Amy Goldschlager, writing in Locus, noted that Crowley "is not known for writing cohesive plots with a driving throughline" and characterised Ka as a work in which layered meditations accumulate toward philosophical enlightenment rather than conventional narrative resolution.

The novel appeared on several best-of-year lists for 2017 and has been compared in scope and ambition to Crowley's earlier works Little, Big and the Aegypt cycle.

== Awards and nominations ==
Year	Award	Category	Result
2018	Mythopoeic Award	Adult Literature	Won
2018	World Fantasy Award	Best Novel	Nominated
2021	Grand Prix de l'Imaginaire	Foreign Novel	Won
