= John Crowley (author) =

American writer of speculative fiction (1942–2026)

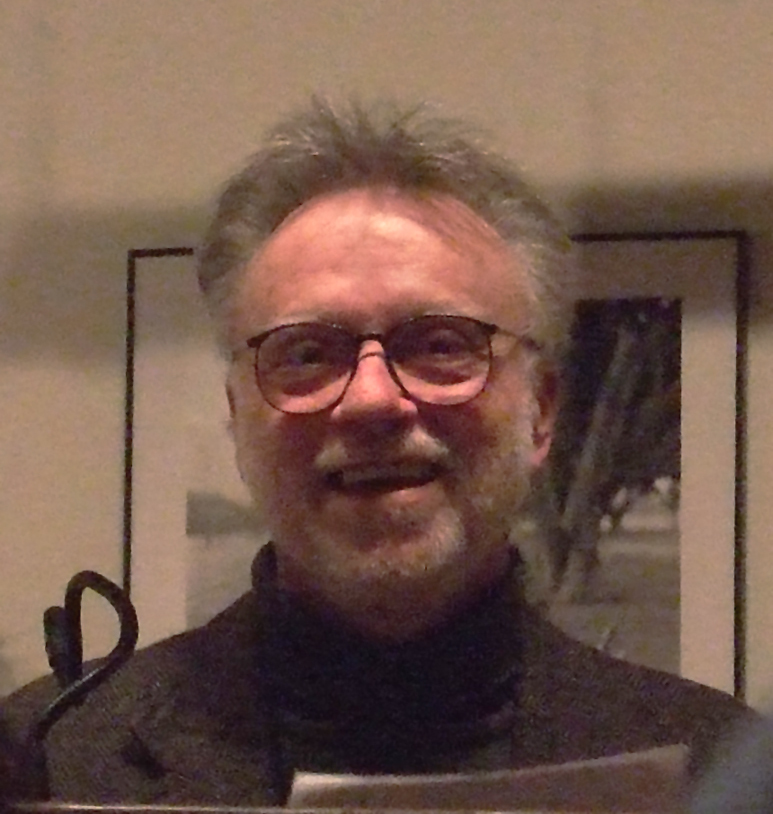
- Crowley at South Street Seaport in 2007
- Born: December 1, 1942; Presque Isle, Maine, U.S.
- Died: August 8, 2026 (aged 83); Conway, Massachusetts, U.S.
- Education: Indiana University
- Occupations: Writer; screenwriter; lecturer
- Spouse: Laurie Block (m. 1984)
- Children: 2
- Writing career
- Language: English
- Period: 1975–2024
- Genres: Fantasy, science fiction, historical fiction, essayist
- Notable works: Little, Big; Ægypt (The Solitudes, Love & Sleep, Dæmonomania, Endless Things); Ka: Dar Oakley in the Ruin of Ymr
- Notable awards: World Fantasy Award for Life Achievement
- Website: crowleycrow.livejournal.com

John Crowley (/ˈkraʊli/; December 1, 1942 – August 8, 2026) was an American author of fantasy, science fiction, historical fiction, and non-fiction. He studied at Indiana University and had a second career as a documentary film writer.

Crowley was best known as the author of Little, Big (1981), a work which received the World Fantasy Award for Best Novel and was called "a neglected masterpiece" by Harold Bloom, and his Ægypt series of novels, which revolve around the same themes of Hermeticism, memory, families and religion. His novel Ka: Dar Oakley in the Ruin of Ymr (2017) won the Mythopoeic Award in 2018 and was nominated for the World Fantasy Award for Best Novel, while critics compared it in scope and ambition to Crowley's earlier works Little, Big and the Aegypt cycle.

== Early life and education ==
John Crowley was born in Presque Isle, Maine, on December 1, 1942; his father was then an officer in the US Army Air Corps. He grew up in Vermont, northeastern Kentucky and (for the longest stretch) Indiana, where he went to high school and college. He studied at Indiana University. He moved to New York City after college to pursue filmmaking, and found work in documentary films, an occupation he pursued until his death.

== Career ==
His first published novels were science fiction: The Deep (1975) and Beasts (1976). Engine Summer (1979) was nominated for the 1980 American Book Award in a one-year category Science Fiction; it appears in David Pringle's Science Fiction: The 100 Best Novels. In 1981 came Little, Big, covered in Pringle's sequel, Modern Fantasy: The 100 Best Novels.

In 1987 Crowley embarked on an ambitious four-volume novel, Ægypt, comprising The Solitudes (originally published as Ægypt), Love & Sleep, Dæmonomania, and Endless Things, published in May 2007. This series and Little, Big were cited when Crowley received the prestigious American Academy of Arts and Letters Award for Literature.

Crowley was also the recipient of an Ingram Merrill Foundation grant. James Merrill, the organization's founder, greatly loved Little, Big, and was blurbed praising Crowley on the first edition of Love & Sleep. His recent novels are The Translator, recipient of the Premio Flaiano (Italy); Lord Byron’s Novel: The Evening Land, which contains an entire imaginary novel by the poet; and Four Freedoms, about workers at an Oklahoma defense plant during World War II. A novella, The Girlhood of Shakespeare's Heroines, appeared in 2002. A museum-quality 25th anniversary edition of Little, Big, featuring the art of Peter Milton and a critical introduction by Harold Bloom, has been completed.

His short fiction is collected in four volumes: Novelty (containing the World Fantasy Award-winning novella Great Work of Time), Antiquities, Novelties & Souvenirs, and And Go Like This, the last two volumes containing all his short fiction from 1977 to 2019. Two collections of essays and reviews entitled In Other Words and Reading Backwards were published in 2007 and 2019 respectively.

Most of the ideas he had for books occurred about ten years before he actually started work.

In 1989 Crowley and his wife Laurie Block founded Straight Ahead Pictures to produce media (film, video, radio and internet) on American history and culture. Crowley wrote scripts for short films and documentaries, and many historical documentaries for public television; his work received numerous awards and has been shown at the New York Film Festival, the Berlin Film Festival, and many others. His scripts include The World of Tomorrow (on the 1939 World's Fair), No Place to Hide (on the bomb shelter obsession), The Hindenburg (for HBO), and FIT: Episodes in the History of the Body (American fitness practices and beliefs over the decades; with Laurie Block).

Crowley's correspondence with literary critic Harold Bloom, and their mutual appreciation, led in 1993 to Crowley taking up a post at Yale University, where he taught courses in Utopian fiction, fiction writing, and screenplay writing. Bloom claimed on Contentville.com that Little, Big ranks among the five best novels by a living writer, and included Little, Big, Ægypt (The Solitudes), and Love & Sleep in his canon of literature (in the appendix to The Western Canon, 1994). In his Preface to Snake's-Hands, Bloom identifies Crowley as his "favorite contemporary writer", and the Ægypt series as his "favorite romance...after Little, Big".

His novel Ka: Dar Oakley in the Ruin of Ymr, published in 2017, was met with considerable critical recognition, earning the Mythopoeic Award in 2018 and receiving a nomination for the World Fantasy Award for Best Novel the same year. Critics were notably generous in their assessments, with many drawing comparisons between the work's scope and ambition and that of Crowley's previous novels, Little, Big and the Aegypt series, situating it within the broader tradition of his most celebrated writing.

Some of his nonfiction writing appeared bimonthly in Harper's Magazine in the form of his "Easy Chair" column, which ended in 2016.

From 1993 he taught creative writing at Yale University. In 1992 he received the Award in Literature from the American Academy and Institute of Arts and Letters.

Crowley also taught at the Clarion West Writers' Workshop held annually in Seattle, Washington.

== Personal life and death ==
Crowley married film producer and researcher Laurie Block in 1984, and their twins were born in 1987. They lived in Massachusetts.

Crowley died in Conway, Massachusetts on August 8, 2026, at the age of 83.

== Awards ==
- 1982: Little, Big received the World Fantasy Award for Best Novel and the Mythopoeic Fantasy Award
- 1990: Great Work of Time received the World Fantasy Award for Best Novella
- 1992: American Academy and Institute of Arts and Letters Award in Literature
- 1997: Gone received the Locus Award for Best Short Story
- 1999: "La Grande oeuvre du temps", the French language edition of "Great Work of Time" (translated by Monique LeBailly), won the Grand Prix de l'Imaginaire, Nouvelle étrangère (Grand Prize for translated story)
- 2003: The Translator received the Italian Premio Flaiano
- 2006: World Fantasy Award for Life Achievement
- 2007: Bulgakov Award of Portal SF Assembly (Kyiv, Ukraine)
- 2018: "Spring Break" received the Edgar Award
- 2018: Ka: Dar Oakley in the Ruin of Ymr received the Mythopoeic Fantasy Award
- 2021: Kra, Dar Duchesne dans les ruines de l’Ymr, the French language edition of Ka: Dar Oakley in the Ruin of Ymr, received the Grand Prix de l'Imaginaire for Foreign Novel

== Bibliography ==
=== Novels ===
- The Deep, Doubleday (1975), illustrated by John Cayea, Wayne Anderson in 1977, and Yvonne Gilbert in 1984
- Beasts, Doubleday (1976), illustrated by John Cayea, and Yvonne Gilbert in 1983
- Engine Summer, Doubleday (1979) — John W. Campbell Memorial Award runner-up, American Book Award and BSFA Award finalist, 1980, illustrated by Gary Friedman, and Yvonne Gilbert in 1983
- Little, Big, Bantam (1981) — 1982 World Fantasy Award and Mythopoeic Award winner; Locus runner-up; BSFA, Hugo, and Nebula nominee, illustrated by Anne Yvonne Gilbert in 1983
- The Translator, William Morrow (2002)
- Lord Byron's Novel: The Evening Land, William Morrow (2005)
- Four Freedoms, William Morrow (2009)
- Ka: Dar Oakley in the Ruin of Ymr, Saga Press (2017) — Mythopoeic Award winner; World Fantasy Award nominee
- Flint and Mirror: A Novel of History and Magic, Tor Books (2022)

==== The Ægypt Cycle ====
- Ægypt, Bantam (1987); later revised and republished under intended original title, The Solitudes, The Overlook Press (2007) — 1988 World Fantasy Award and Arthur C. Clarke Award nominee
- Love & Sleep, Bantam (1994); revised edition, The Overlook Press (2008) — 1995 WFA nominee
- Dæmonomania, Bantam (2000); revised edition, The Overlook Press (2008)
- Endless Things, Small Beer Press (2007); revised edition, The Overlook Press (2009) — 2008 Locus Award fifth place

===== Note =====
Crowley's short story "Flint and Mirror" (2018) was presented as "recently discovered among uncatalogued papers of the novelist Fellowes Kraft" (one of the Ægypt's protagonists). He expanded the story into the 2022 novel of the same name, though the link to Ægypt was omitted.

=== Short fiction ===
- "Antiquities" (1977, in Whispers: An Anthology of Fantasy and Horror)
- "Somewhere to Elsewhere" (1978 but printed as 1977, in The Little Magazine; an earlier draft of part of the first chapter and all of the second chapter of Little, Big)
- "Where Spirits Gat Them Home" (1978, in Shadows anthology; later revised as "Her Bounty to the Dead")
- "The Single Excursion of Caspar Last" (1979, in Gallery magazine; later incorporated into "Great Work of Time")
- "The Reason for the Visit" (1980, in Interfaces anthology)
- "The Green Child" (1981, in Elsewhere anthology)
- "Novelty" (1983, in Interzone magazine)
- "Snow" (1985, in Omni magazine) — 1985 Locus Award third place
- "The Nightingale Sings at Night" (1989, in Novelty)
- "Great Work of Time" (novella, 1989, in Novelty), Bantam (1991) — 1990 World Fantasy Award and 1999 Grand Prix de l'Imaginaire winner
- "In Blue" (novella, 1989, in Novelty)
- "Missolonghi 1824" (1990, in Isaac Asimov's Science Fiction Magazine)
- "Exogamy" (1993, in Omni Best Science Fiction Three anthology)
- "Gone" (1996, in The Magazine of Fantasy & Science Fiction) — 1997 Locus Award winner
- "Lost and Abandoned" (1997, in Black Swan, White Raven anthology)
- "An Earthly Mother Sits and Sings" (2000, published as an original chapbook by Dreamhaven Press, illustrated by Charles Vess; included into Flint and Mirror)
- "The War Between the Objects and the Subjects" (2002, in J. K. Potter's Embrace the Mutation anthology)
- "The Girlhood of Shakespeare's Heroines" (novella, 2002, in Conjunctions: 39, The New Wave Fabulists, edited by Peter Straub), Subterranean Press (2005)
- "Little Yeses, Little Nos" (2005, in The Yale Review; Mount Auburn Street cycle, 1)
- "Conversation Hearts" (2008; published as a chapbook by Subterranean Press)
- "And Go Like This" (2011, in Naked City anthology)
- "Tom Mix" (vignette, 2012, online; republished as "In the Tom Mix Museum")
- "Glow Little Glowworm" (2012, in Conjunctions: 59, Colloquy; reprinted as "Glow Little Glow-Worm"; Mount Auburn Street cycle, 2)
- "The Million Monkeys of M. Borel" (2016, in Conjunctions: 67, Other Aliens)
- "This Is Our Town" (2017, in Totalitopia)
- "Mount Auburn Street" (2017, in The Yale Review; Mount Auburn Street cycle, 3)
- "Spring Break" (2017, in New Haven Noir anthology) — 2018 Edgar Award winner
- "Flint and Mirror" (2018, in The Book of Magic anthology; expanded into a novel of the same name)
- "Anosognosia" (2019, in And Go Like This)
- "Basement Cat" (2020, online)
- "Hit" (2021, online)
- "Squawk Box" (2021, online)
- "Poker Night at the Elks Club 1938" (2022, in Conjunctions: 79, Onword; 2024, in Two Chapters in a Family Chronicle)
- "Percy and Lulu Go to Vermont" (2024, in Two Chapters in a Family Chronicle)
- The Sixties: A Forged Diary (2024, Ninepin Press)
- "An Apologue" (dated 2021 but 2024, an appendix to limited editions of Little, Big that connects this novel with Ka)

=== Collections ===
- Novelty, Doubleday (1989); collects "The Nightingale Sings At Night", "Great Work of Time", "In Blue" and the previously published "Novelty".
- Antiquities: Seven Stories, Incunabula (1993); collects all of his stories to that point which were not included in Novelty.
- Novelties and Souvenirs: Collected Short Fiction, Perennial (2004); collects all of his short fiction up to that point, with the exception of "The Girlhood of Shakespeare's Heroines".
- Totalitopia, PM Press (2017); collects four stories ("This Is Our Town", "Gone", "In the Tom Mix Museum", "And Go Like This"), three essays and the interview.
- And Go Like This: Stories, Small Beer Press (2019); collects all of his short fiction from 2002 to 2019.
- Two Chapters in a Family Chronicle, Ninepin Press (2024).

=== Omnibuses ===
- Beasts/Engine Summer/Little Big, QPBC (1991)
- Three Novels, Bantam (1994; later published as Otherwise: Three Novels by John Crowley. It includes The Deep, Beasts, Engine Summer).

=== Edited ===
- The Chemical Wedding: by Christian Rosencreutz: A Romance in Eight Days by Johann Valentin Andreae in a New Version, Small Beer Press (2016)

=== Documentary scripts ===
- America Lost and Found (1979)
- Hindenburg: Ship of Doom (1980)
- No Place to Hide (1983; 30 min)
- America and Lewis Hine (1984, with Laurie Block and Daniel Allentuck; 60 min)
- The World of Tomorrow (1984; 76 min)
- Are We Winning Mommy? America and the Cold War (1986, with Laurie Block; 87 min)
- A $10 Horse and a $40 Saddle (1987)
- Fit: Episodes in the History of the Body (1991, with Laurie Block; 74 min)
- Pearl Harbor: Surprise and Remembrance (1991)
- Liberators: Fighting on Two Fronts in World War II (1992; 90 min)
- Nobody's Girls: Five Women of the West (1995; 90 min)
- Morning Sun (2003, written with Carma Hinton and Geremie Barmé; 117 min)

=== Nonfiction ===
==== Essay collections ====
- In Other Words, Subterranean Press (2007).
- Reading Backwards: Essays & Reviews, 2005-2018, Subterranean Press (2019).
- Two Talks on Writing, Ninepin Press (2024); includes "Practicing the Arts of Peace" and "The Uses of Allegory".
- Seventy-Four Dreams, Ninepin Press (2024).

==== Articles ====
Crowley's articles and essay-reviews have appeared in Lapham's Quarterly, the Boston Review, Tin House, and Harper's.

- Crowley, John (January 2010). "End of an age". Locus (588): 6, 53–54.

=== Audio books ===
- Ægypt, Blackstone Audiobooks (2007; unabridged reading of The Solitudes by the author.)
- Little, Big, Blackstone Audiobooks (2011; unabridged reading by the author.)
- Ka: Dar Oakley in the Ruin of Ymr, Brilliance Audio (2017; unabridged reading by the author.)
