= The Solitudes (novel) =

Novel by John Crowley

- 1988 edition of The Solitudes by VGSF, bearing the original title
- Author: John Crowley
- Original title: Ægypt
- Language: English
- Series: Ægypt
- Subject: History, Hermeticism, English Renaissance
- Genre: Fantasy
- Publisher: Bantam Books
- Publication date: April 1987 (1st edition)
- Publication place: United States
- Pages: 390 (Hardcover edition)
- Followed by: Love & Sleep

The Solitudes (originally titled Ægypt contrary to the author's wishes) is a 1987 fantasy novel by John Crowley. It is Crowley's fifth published novel and the first novel in the Ægypt tetralogy. Titled after Luis de Góngora's Las Soledades (English: "The Solitudes"), the novel follows Pierce Moffett, a college history professor in his retreat from ordinary, academic life to pastoral life of Faraway Hills. While in the area, Pierce comes up with a plan to write a book about Hermeticism, in the process finding several parallels with his own project and that of the nearly forgotten local novelist Fellowes Kraft.

The novel takes place in two time periods and features three main protagonists; that of Pierce's in the late twentieth century, and that of John Dee, Edward Kelley and Giordano Bruno as from the historical novels of Kraft in the Renaissance. The difference is marked stylistically by dashes indicating dialogue for events that happened in the Renaissance and events in the twentieth century marked by dialogue in quotation marks.

The novel was nominated for the 1988 Arthur C. Clarke Award, and the 1988 World Fantasy Award.

== Background ==
The novel is structured basically as a künstlerroman ("artist's novel"), following the late-life development of Pierce Moffett in his attempts to finish a fictional book combining speculative history, fiction and a fictional world he created as a child called Ægypt. Pierce's two main sources for the book include the work of his graduate professor and speculative historian Frank Walker Barr, and the highly productive historical novelist Fellowes Kraft. Barr's theories are likely based on the speculative historians Crowley cites in his short note at the beginning of the novel, which names the work of Robert Graves, the nearly forgotten Pre-Raphaelite Katharine Emma Maltwood, and especially Dame Frances Yates, who Crowley cites as a deliberate influence, calling the novel a "fantasia on her themes".

Kraft, on the other hand, is a historical novelist native to Blackbury Jambs in whose novels Pierce first reads about Giordano Bruno, and whose uncompleted novel about John Dee and Bruno meeting is interspersed throughout the novel. His novels are known for their interesting sources, but Rosie finds in them colour and style with little driving force to illustrate their histories, and Pierce finds too simplistic in their settings, but a useful starting point in illuminating the minds of their subjects. Kraft has been widely speculated to be based on the life and work of David Derek Stacton, of whom Crowley is a notable admirer, though Stacton is never known to have written on the subjects of either John Dee or Bruno. On his blog, Crowley identified Kraft as an "intentional creation" who nevertheless resembles how Crowley imagines Stacton "if he'd lived to be old". Coincidentally, the project of a long, uncompleted work on Bruno has many similarities to The Last Confession by Morris West.

This novel of the sequence is sectioned based on the first three astrological houses, Vita, signifying life; Lucrum, signifying wealth; and Fratres signifying brothers or brotherhood.

== Plot ==
The novel begins, like Goethe's Faust, with a "Prologue in Heaven", depicting John Dee and his scryer Edward Kelley–whom Dee as yet only knows as Edward Talbot–watching Angels in a crystal. Suddenly, to their dread, the angels scatter and a child appears in the glass, "holding a space" Doctor Dee knows to be absolutely immense, into which both feel their souls being drawn. During a "Prologue on Earth" immediately following, a young Pierce Moffett, preparing to serve as an altar boy reads a novel about Giordano Bruno (later revealed to be by Fellowes Kraft), the sixteenth century Dominican Friar, and finds himself sharply identifying with the narrator.

The novel proper begins under the sign of Vita, with Pierce now in middle age, taking a bus to apply for a job at Peter Ramus College. Along the way he is reading a new translation of Las Soledades of Luis de Góngora. The bus stops in the Faraway Hills, where Pierce meets Spofford, a previous student of his. Impulsively, Pierce decides to forget the interview and leave with Spofford for the town of Blackbury Jambs nearby.

While there, Pierce comes to conceive of a novel combining his vast knowledge of history along with speculations about Hermetic philosophy, his interest in Giordano Bruno, as well as local author's Fellowes Kraft's unfinished series of novels involving Bruno and John Dee. In the meantime, he is drawn closer to Rosie Mucho. At the same time Rosie takes the painful first steps of divorcing her husband Mike. Interspersed throughout the novel are scenes from Kraft's novels, involving John Dee's first experiments with the occult, and his first meetings with other figures including William Shakespeare and Edward Kelley, as well as a second novel, featuring Giordano Bruno's education, rise to fame, and ultimately to his wandering years under the threat of death from the Church.

== Characters ==
As earlier stated, the novel follows both characters in the present, as well as those in the Historical novels of Fellowes Kraft

Characters in the present

- Pierce Moffett - The widely educated protagonist of the novel. Pierce has mild synesthesia as to numbers and has a very easy time remembering historical dates. Holding a degree in "Renaissance Studies" Pierce's story generally follows his attempts to both satisfy his curiosity and find meaningful employment for the knowledge he has thus far accumulated.
- Rosie Mucho - A long-time resident of Blackbury Jambs, and eventually Pierce's close friend. Throughout the novel she goes the first painful steps of divorcing her husband Mike Mucho while trying to keep her daughter Samantha from being exposed to the process. Her surname may be a reference to the husband of Oedipa Maas in Thomas Pynchon's The Crying of Lot 49.
- Boney Rassmussen - Rosie's uncle, and a member of the board managing Kraft's estate. He eventually offers Rosie the job of keeping Kraft's house.
- Val - The town fortune teller, whose divinations are startlingly accurate.
- Julie Rosengarten - Pierce's one-time girlfriend and literary agent. After pitching the idea for his novel, Julie first interests Pierce in marketing the idea towards New Age sensibilities.
- Beau Brachman - Rosie's close friend, and frequent babysitter of Sam Mucho. Beau is an enthusiastic disciple of New Age philosophy, and widely admired throughout the town. Throughout the novel his appearance is humorously misread, first by Rosie noticing how much he resembles an iconographic Christ, and by Pierce as the god Pan.

Characters of the Renaissance

- John Dee - The Elizabethan cryptographer, doctor, alchemist and skryer. His character is revealed in two novels by Kraft, the first being Bitten Apples about the early life of Shakespeare, and the second being Kraft's unpublished novel.
- Giordano Bruno - The Dominican friar, first encountered in the novels that Pierce reads as a young boy and later in the unpublished work Pierce finds in Kraft's estate.
- Edward Kelley - John Dee's assistant, going by the name Edward Talbot. Dee however, is constantly suspicious of Talbot.

Brief appearances are also made by William Shakespeare and his family, and Queen Elizabeth.

== Reception ==
Dave Langford reviewed Aegypt for White Dwarf #95, and stated that "Aegypt is the beginning of a long, strange journey, and is very beautifully written."

A review in the Times Literary Supplement found in the novel "its own vivid reality is an absorbing one, and it leaves the reader impatient for the second volume." In a review for the last novel in the Ægypt cycle in the Boston Review, James Hynes noted that the book's original reception was "widely and respectfully reviewed".

Harold Bloom included the novel in the last "Chaotic" Canon in the appendices of Western Canon.

== Selected editions ==
- Crowley, John (1987). Aegypt (1st ed.). New York: Bantam Books. ISBN 0-553-05194-6.
- Crowley, John (1994). Aegypt (Bantam trade paperback ed.). New York: Bantam Books. ISBN 0-553-37430-3.
