= Gary Friedman =

American business executive

- Born: August 6, 1957 (age 68); San Francisco, California, U.S.
- Occupation(s): CEO, Chairman of the Board of Restoration Hardware

Gary Friedman is the chairman and chief executive officer of home furnishings retailer Restoration Hardware, Inc.

== Early life ==
Gary Friedman was born in San Francisco to a Jewish family. When he was five years of age, his father died and he was raised by his mother in Sonoma, California. While attending community college, he worked part-time at The Gap, in 1977. He became the youngest manager in the company's history, in addition to the company's youngest district manager and regional manager.

== Career ==
From 1988 to 2001, Friedman worked for Williams-Sonoma, Inc., where he served in various capacities, including as president and chief operating officer from May 2000 to March 2001, and as chief merchandising officer and Director of Retail Stores for both Williams-Sonoma and Pottery Barn brands from 1992 to 2000.

He was appointed president and chief executive officer of Restoration Hardware in June 2011 and served as co-chief executive officer since 2001. On August 16, 2012, Friedman stepped down after an alleged relationship with a 26-year-old female subordinate employee. Friedman was reappointed co-CEO and chairman of the board for Restoration Hardware in July 2013. At Restoration Hardware he has overseen several reinventions of the company.
