= Edward Kelley =

English alchemist, occultist (1555–1597/8)

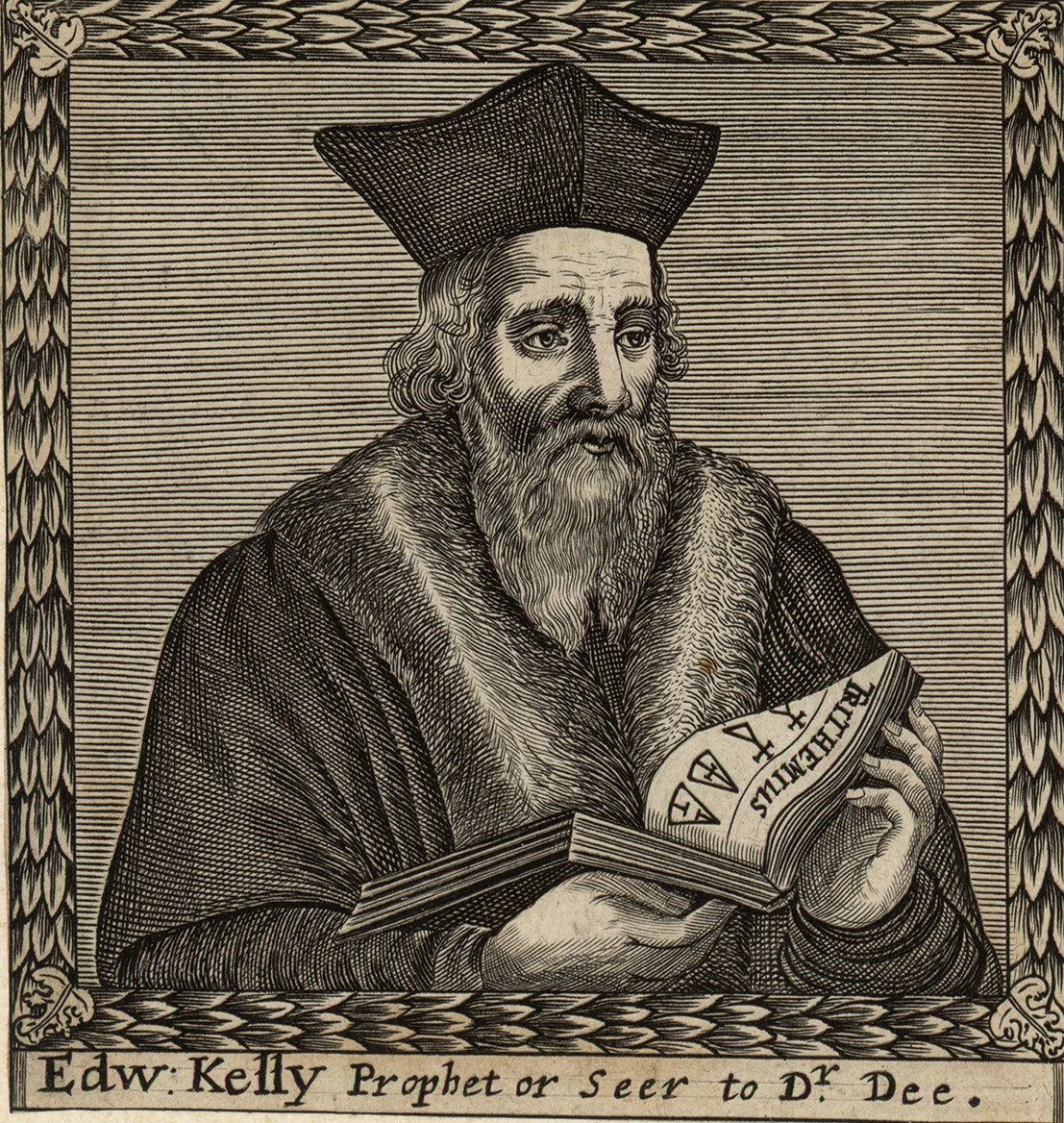
- An 18th-century engraving of Edward Kelley
- Born: 1 August 1555; Worcester, England
- Died: 1597/8 (aged c. 42); Most, Bohemia

Edward Kelley (Note: Smith (1909): "Dee is careful to give his former skryer his full title 'Sir Edward Kelly, Knight, at the Emperor's Court at Prague.'") or Kelly, also known as Edward Talbot (UK: /ˈtɔːlbət/; 1 August 1555 – 1597/8), was an English Renaissance occultist and scryer. He is known for working with John Dee in his magical investigations. Besides the professed ability to see spirits or angels in a "shew-stone" or mirror, which John Dee so valued, Kelley also said that he possessed the secret of transmuting base metals into gold, a goal of alchemy, as well as the philosopher's stone itself.

Legends began to surround Kelley shortly after his death. His flamboyant biography, his relationships with Queen Elizabeth I's royal magus John Dee and Rudolf II, Holy Roman Emperor, his reputation of having great alchemical skill, and his claimed ability to communicate with angels have all led to his relative notoriety among historians.

== Biography ==
=== Birth and early career ===
Much of Kelley's early life is obscure. He said he was descended from the family of Ui Maine in Ireland. He was born at Worcester on 1 August 1555, at 4 P.M. according to a horoscope that John Dee drew up (based on notes Dee kept in his almanac/diary). His sister Elizabeth was born in 1558, and he had a brother Thomas who later joined him in Dee's household. However, much of Kelley's life before meeting John Dee is not known. He may have studied at Oxford under the name of Talbot; whether or not he attended university, Kelly was educated and knew Latin and possibly some Greek by the time he met Dee.

Anthony à Wood records in Athenae Oxoniensis that Kelley, "being about 17 years of age, at which time he attained to a competency of Grammar learning at Worcester and elsewhere, was sent to Oxford, but to what house I cannot tell. However, I have been informed by an ancient Bachelor of Divinity who in his younger years had been an Amanuensis to Mr Thomas Allen of Gloucester-hall, that he (Kelly) had spent some time in that House; whereupon I, recurring to the matriculation, could not find the name Kelly, only Talbot of Ireland, three of which name were students there in 1573, 74, &c... This relation being somewhat dubiously delivered to me, I must tell you that Kelly having an unsettled mind, left Oxford abruptly, without being entitled into the matricula." According to some accounts, Kelley was pilloried in Lancaster for forgery or counterfeiting. Both his ears were supposedly cropped, a common punishment during the Tudor Dynasty. He usually wore a cap on his head, and it was thought this was to hide his lack of ears. John Weever says, "Kelly (otherwise called Talbot) that famous English alchemist of our times, who flying out of his own country (after he had lost both his ears at Lancaster) was entertained with Rudolf the second, and last of that Christian name, Emperor of Germany."

=== With Dee in England ===
Kelley approached John Dee in 1582. Dee had already been trying to contact angels with the help of a scryer, or crystal-gazer, but he had not been successful. Kelley professed the ability to do so, and impressed Dee with his first trial. Kelley became Dee's regular scryer or medium. Dee and Kelley devoted huge amounts of time and energy to these "spiritual conferences". From 1582 to 1589, Kelley's life was closely tied to Dee's. In those seven years, they conducted conferences or seances, including "prayers for enlightenment... in the spirit of Dee's ecumenical hopes that alchemy and angelic knowledge would heal the rift of Christendom". Dee also believed that the angels held knowledge that would aid the English in their discoveries of new and uncharted lands on Earth.

Kelley married a widow, Jane (or Joanna) Cooper of Chipping Norton (1563–1606). He helped educate her two children: the girl, future poet Westonia, later described him as a 'kind stepfather' and noted how he took her in after the deaths of her two grandmothers. Kelley had also hired a Latin tutor for her, named John Hammond (Johannes Hammonius in Latin).

About a year after entering into Dee's service, Kelley appeared with an alchemical book (The Book of Dunstan) and a quantity of a red powder which, Kelley said, he and a certain John Blokley had been led to by a "spiritual creature" at Northwick Hill. (Accounts of Kelley's finding the book and the powder in the ruins of Glastonbury Abbey were first published by Elias Ashmole, but are contradicted by Dee's diaries.) With the powder (whose secret was presumably hidden in the book) Kelley believed he could prepare a red "tincture" which would allow him to transmute base metals into gold. He reportedly demonstrated its power a few times over the years, including in Bohemia (present Czech Republic) where he and Dee resided for many years.

=== With Dee on the Continent ===
In 1583, Dee became acquainted with Olbracht Łaski, a Polish nobleman interested in alchemy. In September of that year, Dee, Kelley, and their families left England with Łaski for the Continent. Dee sought the patronage of Emperor Rudolf II in Prague and King Stefan I of Poland in Kraków; Dee apparently failed to impress either monarch enough to earn a permanent station. Dee and Kelley lived a nomadic life in Central Europe, meanwhile continuing their spiritual conferences. While Kelley was apparently more interested in alchemy than in scrying, Dee seemed more interested in making contact with the angels. Kelley's supposed value was as a medium, as only he was able to understand and scribe their language. According to those close to Dee (particularly his son Arthur) there was no little tension between the two men and their families as they journeyed through Europe.

Kelley and Dee's involvement in necromancy eventually caught the attention of the Catholic Church, and on 27 March 1587 they were required to defend themselves in a hearing with the papal nuncio, Germanico Malaspina, bishop of San Severo. Dee handled the interview with tact, but Kelley is said to have infuriated the nuncio by stating that one of the problems with the Catholic Church is the "poor conduct of many of the priests." The nuncio noted in a letter that he was tempted to toss Kelley out of the window (defenestration was a somewhat common tradition in Prague at the time).

In 1586, Kelley and Dee found the patronage of the wealthy Bohemian Lord William of Rosenberg, a senior official from a powerful family who also shared Kelley and Dee's alchemical interests and is known to have participated in spiritual sessions with the two men. Kelley and Dee settled in the town of Třeboň and continued their research there (in Dee's journal, he states "Oct. 26th, Mr. Edward Kelly came to Trebona from Prage"), and according to Dee's diary it was during this time that Kelley is said to have performed his first alchemical transmutation (on 19 December 1586). Kelley's skilled draughtsmanship is evident in the notes taken by Dee during certain séances (these notes are available in Dee's Book of Enoch). These notes show Kelley's initial commitment to the alchemists' mutual goal. However, he soon began to waver and expressed a desire to stop. Dee insisted that they continue. In 1587, possibly as an act to sever the sessions, Kelley revealed to Dee that the angels (namely a spirit "Madimi") had ordered them to share everything they had, including their wives. Dee, anguished by the "order" of the angels, subsequently broke off the spiritual conferences. He did, however, share his wife. This "cross-matching" occurred on 22 May 1588 and is noted in John Dee's diary: "May 22nd, Mistris Kelly received the sacrament, and to me and my wife gave her hand in charity; and we rushed not from her."

Though it seems the two shared an intimate and often cooperative partnership, it was often characterised as "quarrelsome" and "tense" by contemporaries and historians. Also they were clearly involved in activities that could be seen as heretical to the Catholic Church of the time, so a certain amount of tact and secrecy was required. Kelly left Dee at Třeboň in 1589, possibly to join the emperor's court at Prague. Dee returned to England. They did not see each other again.

The manuscript collector Karl Widemann from Augsburg was between 1587 and 1588 his secretary at the court of Rudolf II, and also worked for the Rosenberg family in Třeboň.

=== Apogee and fall ===
In England in 1588 rumours circulated that Kelley was arrested by the Emperor for falsely advertising that he could transmute base metals to gold, a skill that Queen Elizabeth could employ. William Cecil wrote to Edward Dyer, an English diplomat, inviting Kelly to return to England and the queen's service.

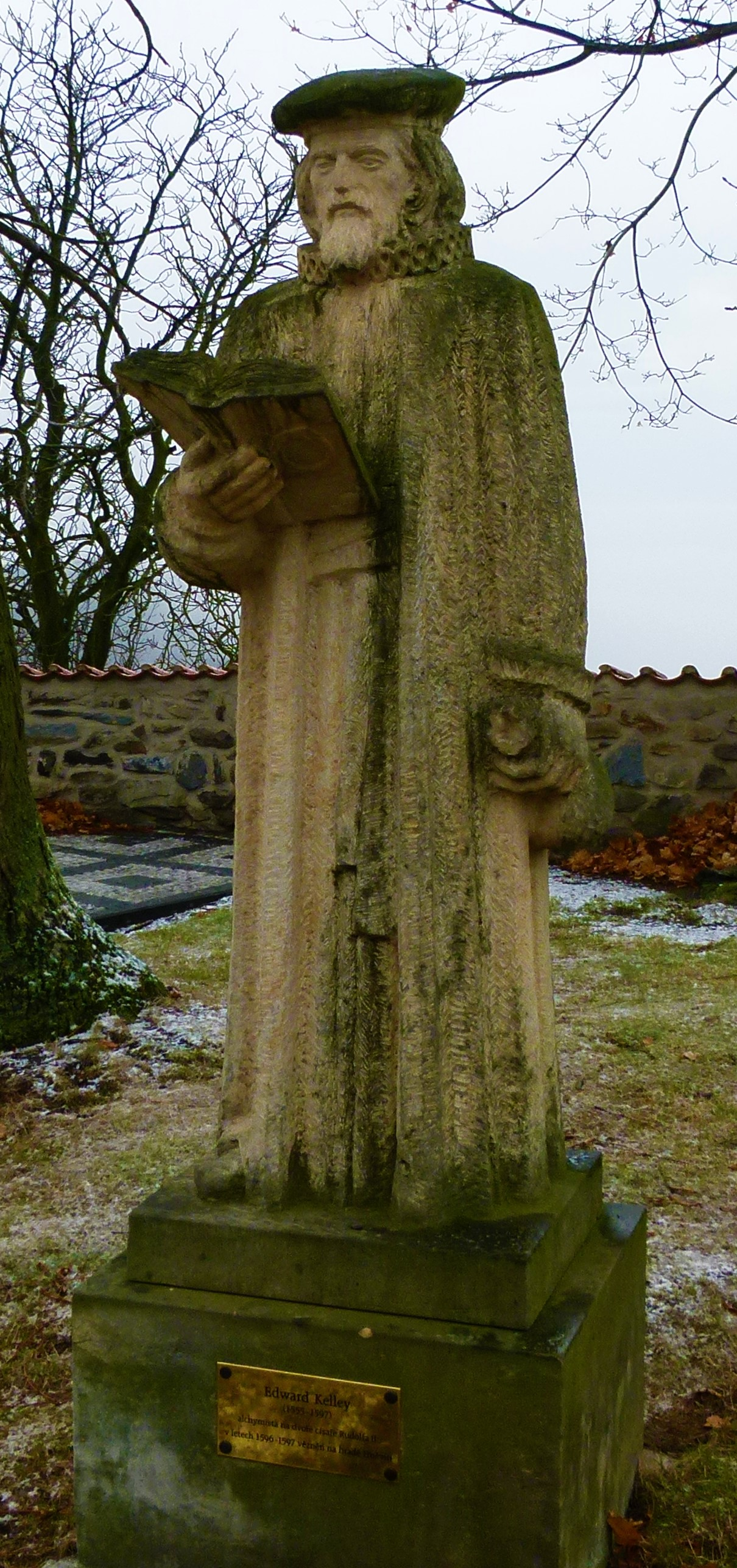
Statue of Kelley at Hněvín Castle in Most, Czech Republic

In October 1590 one of his associates, Ralph Lacy, a recusant from Yorkshire, arrived at the court of James VI of Scotland from Prague. He had served the king's grandfather, the Earl of Lennox. The English ambassador Robert Bowes was suspicious of him, and persuaded James VI to send him back.

By 1590 Kelley was living an opulent lifestyle in Europe, enjoying the patronage of nobility: he received several estates and large sums of money from Rosenberg. Meanwhile, he continued his alchemical experiments until he had convinced Rudolf II that he was ready to start producing gold, the purpose of his work. Rudolf knighted him Sir Edward Kelley of Imany and New Lüben on 23 February 1590 (but it is possible that this happened in 1589). In May 1591, Rudolf had Kelley arrested and imprisoned in Křivoklát Castle outside Prague, supposedly for killing an official named Jiri Hunkler in a duel; it is possible that he also did not want Kelley to escape before he had actually produced any gold.

It was reported that Kelley refused to eat. He was still held in a dungeon at Pürglitz (Křivoklát) in July 1591. According to a Fugger newsletter, he had taken huge sums of money from the emperor and Peter Vok of Rosenberg.

In 1595, Kelly agreed to co-operate and return to his alchemical work; he was released and restored to his former status. When he failed to produce any gold, he was again imprisoned, this time in Hněvín Castle in Most. His wife and stepdaughter attempted to hire an imperial counselor who might free Kelley from imprisonment, but he died a prisoner in late 1597/early 1598 of injuries received while attempting to escape. However, according to the account of Simon Tadeáš, Rudolf II's geologist, he poisoned himself in front of his wife and children.

In 1674, Sir Thomas Browne, an acquaintance of John Dee's son Arthur Dee, in correspondence to Elias Ashmole, stated that "Arthur Dee said also that Kelley dealt not justly by his father, and that afterwards imprisoned by the Emperor in a castle, from whence attempting an escape down the wall, he fell and broke his leg and was imprisoned again."

A few of Kelley's writings are extant today, including two alchemical verse treatises in English, and three other treatises, which he dedicated to Rudolf II from prison. They were entitled Tractatus duo egregii de lapide philosophorum una cum theatro astronomiae (1676). The treatises have been translated as The Alchemical Writings of Edward Kelley (1893).

== Angelical, the "Enochian" language ==
Kelley claimed that angels communicated to him in a special language termed 'Angelical', subsequently called Enochian, which he then relayed to Dee. Some modern cryptographers argue that Kelley invented it (see for example the introduction to The Complete Enochian Dictionary by Donald Laycock). Some say that this was all a farce, but are not clear whether Dee was a victim or an accomplice. Because of this precedent, and of a dubious connection between the Voynich Manuscript and John Dee (through Roger Bacon), Kelley has been suspected of having fabricated that book too, to swindle Rudolf.

Kelley said that Angelical was dictated by angels whom he saw and heard by means of scrying in a crystal ball or mirror. (Note: Dee experimented in optics, so these tools were always handy.) He also described the angels as communicating by means of tapping out letters displayed in a rectangular tablet. The first third were tapped out with each Angelical word backwards; the following two-thirds with each word forwards. There are no significant errors or discrepancies in word usage between the first and following parts. The English translations were not tapped out but, according to Kelley, appeared on little strips of paper coming out of the angels' mouths.

Dee considered the dictation of the Angelical material highly important for three reasons. First, Dee believed Angelical represented a documentable case of true glossolalia, thereby proving Kelley was actually speaking with angels and not from his imagination. Second, the angels communicated that their language was actually the original prototype of Hebrew: the language with which God spoke to Adam, and thus the first human word. Third, the Angelical material takes the form of a set of conjurations which would summon an extremely powerful set of angels who would reveal many secrets to those who sought them, especially the key to the philosopher's stone, to god-like wisdom, and eternal life.
