= Little, Big =

1981 fantasy novel by John Crowley

- Cover of first edition (Bantam Books, paperback)
- Author: John Crowley
- Language: English
- Genre: Fantasy
- Publisher: Bantam Books
- Publication date: August 1981
- Publication place: United States
- Media type: Print (hardcover, paperback)
- Pages: 538 pp
- Award: World Fantasy Award
- ISBN: 0-553-01266-5
- OCLC: 7596266
- Dewey Decimal: 813/.54 19
- LC Class: PS3553.R597 L5

Little, Big: or, The Fairies' Parliament is a contemporary fantasy novel by John Crowley, published in 1981. It won the World Fantasy Award in 1982.

== Plot ==
Turn-of-the-century American architect John Drinkwater begins to suspect that within this world there lies another (and within that, another and another ad infinitum, each larger than the world that contains it). Towards the center is the realm of the fairies, which his wife, the Englishwoman Violet Bramble, can see and talk with. Drinkwater gathers his thoughts into an ever-evolving book entitled The Architecture of Country Houses. Drinkwater designs and builds a house called Edgewood north of New York City. It is a composite of many styles, each built over and across the others, supposedly as a "sampler" for customers thinking about employing Drinkwater's firm. It has the effect of disorienting visitors and somehow protecting the family, and it proves to be a door leading to the outer realm of Faerie.

At the beginning of the story, well after the deaths of Drinkwater and his wife, their great-granddaughter Daily Alice falls in love with and marries a stranger, "Smoky" Barnable, who she meets at the home of her City cousin George Mouse. Smoky gradually realizes that Alice and her sister Sophie claimed to have seen fairies when they were younger and that they and their family see their history as "the Tale".

In a flashback, it is revealed that many of the residents of the area surrounding Edgewood are descended from John and Violet's son August, who struck a bargain with the fairies that granted him a power over women's hearts matched by their own power over his.

Alice and Smoky have three daughters, Tacey, Lily and Lucy, and a son, Auberon. After an affair with Smoky, Sophie gives birth to a daughter, Lilac. She says Smoky is Lilac's father, but it is actually George Mouse. Lilac is stolen by the fairies and replaced with a changeling.

Alice and Sophie's great-aunt Nora Cloud regularly consults an ancient set of tarot cards to find out about such mundane matters as the weather or how soon a visitor will be arriving at the house. Smoky's instructions for his journey to Edgewood to marry Alice were based on one of Nora's card readings. Sophie learns how to use them from Aunt Cloud.

The story moves forward to Auberon as a young man venturing to "the City" (Manhattan), where he stays in George Mouse's gigantic ruinous compound of Old Law tenements, which Mouse has converted into a farmstead. The City is near collapse and rife with crime and poverty. Auberon falls in love with a striking and vivacious young Puerto Rican woman named Sylvie. They live together until Sylvie is lured away into Faerie. Inconsolable at her departure, Auberon takes to drink.

At this juncture, Russell Eigenblick, a charismatic and secretive politician, rises in popularity and becomes the President of the United States. He advocates civil war, but against what or who is unclear. He is opposed by a covert group of wealthy businessmen and politicians called the Noisy Bridge Rod and Gun Club. They are working with the mage Ariel Hawksquill, a distant relation of the Drinkwater family. Hawksquill divines that Eigenblick is the re-awakened Holy Roman Emperor Frederick Barbarossa and that he has been called from sleep to protect Faerie. Although he has not realized it, his enemy is humanity, which has unknowingly driven the fairies deeper and deeper into hiding. She announces this to the Club, but the members have decided to proceed without her. She becomes Eigenblick's adviser.

Hawksquill meets Auberon and teaches him architecture-based techniques of the art of memory. She recognizes that the cards he mentions are the pack that Eigenblick seeks, as they were made to foretell his return, and she induces him to tell her how to get to Edgewood. In return she gives him her key to a private park (designed by his great-great-grandfather), where he practices the art of memory on his time with Sylvie.

He sinks further into alcoholism. After a drunken sexual encounter with Sylvie's brother Bruno, which Auberon considers a degradation, he lives on the streets. Eventually Lilac appears to him and persuades him to begin a recovery. He moves back into George Mouse's farm and becomes the writer for a soap opera, taking much of his material from his grandfather ″Doc″ Drinkwater's animal stories for children and his mother's letters with stories of her extended family.

Hawksquill goes to Edgewood, where she steals Sophie's tarot cards, recognizing that they are somehow the map describing the route into Faerie. She returns to the City and tries to stop Eigenblick, but it is too late and Eigenblick has her killed. He then disappears and the country falls into a low-key civil war.

The fairies, who can see the future but remember little of the past, understand the peril they are in but forget why, and they prepare to go deeper into the realms of Faerie; however, this cannot happen unless the extended family of the Drinkwaters comes to the mysterious ″Fairies' Parliament″. Lilac visits Sophie and Daily Alice, and Auberon and George, summoning them to that event.

Alice leaves first to find or create the way to Faerie. On Midsummer's Day, the rest of the family assembles at Edgewood including Auberon and George. At the last minute, Smoky – who never really believed in Faerie – chooses not to go, instead devoting himself to finishing the repair of Edgewood's old orrery, which drew energy from the stars to power the home. He succeeds, and is persuaded by Sophie to accompany the family, but he dies of a heart attack before he leaves the borders of Edgewood. The remaining family members walk into the new realm and take the fairies' place, Smoky's funeral turns into Auberon and Sylvie's wedding, and thus the Tale is finally completed.

The book ends with a description of the empty Edgewood as it decays and returns to nature. The house becomes a legend, because it continues to have lights shining even though electricity is scarce in the rest of the country.

== Characters ==
- Evan S. "Smoky" Barnable – One of the novel's protagonists, whose marriage to the Drinkwater family is prophesied long before it occurs. He succeeds the first Auberon (below) as a schoolteacher.
- Alice Dale Drinkwater, known as Daily Alice – Smoky's wife, Sophie's sister and Auberon's mother. She is likewise assured of her destiny from a young age by Nora Cloud.
- Auberon Barnable (the second Auberon) – Smoky's son, and the second protagonist, who eventually leaves for the city to seek a destiny distinct from Edgewood and the interconnected Drinkwater clan.
- Sylvie – A Stateside Puerto Rican worker at George Mouse's farm. She was George's lover but breaks up with him just as Auberon arrives. She can see the brownie who works at the farm and thinks of her as his queen. Her and her brother's stories carry extended references to Lewis Carroll's Sylvie and Bruno.
- Sophie Drinkwater – Alice's sister. After Alice's departure, she leads the walk to Faerie.
- Lilac (surname not used) – Sophie's daughter, ostensibly by Smoky but actually by George Mouse. After being stolen by the fairies, she occasionally appears to Auberon, but no one else sees her till near the end of the story.
- Violet Bramble – Ancestor of the Drinkwater clan. As a young unmarried woman in England, she is found to be pregnant by an unknown partner shortly after her father becomes active in the Theosophical Society. At one of their meetings she meets the first John Drinkwater. She later moves to America and marries him. Violet frequently goes to meet the fairies both from her father's home in England and from Edgewood. She is the first to use the magical tarot cards to see the future.
- John Drinkwater (the first John Drinkwater), architect and later author of The Architecture of Country Houses. He is fascinated by what his wife tells him about the fairies she sees.
- Doctor John Storm "Doc" Drinkwater (the second John Drinkwater) – August Drinkwater's son with Amy Meadows; Alice and Sophie's father. He can understand the speech of animals and writes children's books that are a fictional version of the stories of Thornton Burgess.
- August Drinkwater – Violet Bramble′s son, who enters into a pact with fairies, giving him power to make women fall in love with him, in exchange for his theft of Violet Bramble′s cards, which he returns to the fairies. His power over each girl he seduces is based on his love for her, which drives him to desperation, and he attempts to drown himself in a pond, but is transformed into a trout trapped in the pond. As "Grandfather Trout" he can speak and serves as a conduit for the Drinkwaters to communicate with Faerie. After his transformation, the tarot cards are returned to the Drinkwaters, but subtly altered. Many of the later residents of the five nearby small towns are his illegitimate descendants. At the very end of the Tale the leader of the fairies tells him he will be restored to human form when one of his loves, Marge Juniper, now elderly, comes to his pond and speaks to him.
- Auberon Drinkwater (the first Auberon) – Alice's eccentric great-uncle, the son (by Oliver Hawksquill) who Violet was pregnant with when she met John Drinkwater. He cannot see or communicate with fairies, but attempts to record them, with variable success, by photographing them with his nieces Alice and Sophie as ″mediums″ of a sort, reminiscent of the Cottingley Fairies and of photos of children taken by Lewis Carroll. He is the teacher of the school for the children of the Edgewood area and spends his life in pursuit of concrete evidence of fairies, and in analysis of his findings.
- George Mouse – Smoky's friend who introduces Smoky to his cousins, the Drinkwater family.
- Ariel Hawksquill – A powerful magician who studies the rise of Russell Eigenblick. Granddaughter of Violet Bramble's first lover, Oliver Hawksquill.
- Russell Eigenblick – The despotic president of the United States, late in the history of the family. He is revealed to be the former Holy Roman Emperor, awakened from 800 years' sleep.
- Aunt Nora Cloud – Widow of Henry Cloud, expert card reader and one of the family′s chief oracles.

== Literary significance ==
Harold Bloom included this work in his book The Western Canon, calling it "A neglected masterpiece. The closest achievement we have to the Alice stories of Lewis Carroll." Bloom also recorded that, based on their correspondence, poet James Merrill "loved the book".

Thomas M. Disch described Little, Big as "the best fantasy novel ever. Period." Ursula K. Le Guin wrote that Little, Big is "a book that all by itself calls for a redefinition of fantasy." In Modern Fantasy: The 100 Best Novels, David Pringle described the book as "a work of architectonic sublimity" and wrote that "the author plays with masterly skill on the emotional nerves of awe, rapture, mystery and enchantment." Paul Di Filippo said, "It is hard to imagine a more satisfying work, both on an artistic and an emotional level".

Praise for the book has not been unanimous, however. Reviewing the novel for The Boston Phoenix, John Domini termed it "a betrayal of nearly all its promises. The book may declaim continually, in reference to Fairy Land, that 'the farther in you go, the bigger it gets,' but this flabby tale gets less and less muscular as we peel back page after unnecessary page. Its failure, regrettably and oddly, is at heart one of imagination."

A number of readers and critics have described Little, Big as magical realism, perhaps in an attempt to defend it from being categorized as a work belonging to the sometimes maligned field of genre fiction. However, the novel fits the classic description of low fantasy. Some list it among the early works of urban fantasy or at least as a "classic" part of the movement that developed into it.

2002 Harper paperback edition cover

== Awards and nominations ==
- Winner of the World Fantasy Award, 1982
- Winner of the Mythopoeic Fantasy Award, 1982
- Nominated for the Nebula Award for Best Novel, 1981
- Nominated for the Hugo Award for Best Novel, 1982
- Nominated for the British Science Fiction Association Award, 1982
- Nominated for the Locus Award for Best Fantasy Novel, 1982

== Release details ==
- 1981, USA, Bantam Books, ISBN 0-553-01266-5, Publication date September 1981, trade paperback (black). Simultaneously published in Canada.
- 1982, UK, Victor Gollancz, ISBN 0-575-03065-8, Publication date May 1982, hardcover (white dust jacket).
- 1982, UK, Victor Gollancz, ISBN 0-575-03123-9, Publication date May 1982, trade paperback (white).
- 1983, UK, Methuen, ISBN 0-413-51350-5, Publication date 1983, mass market paperback.
- 1983, USA, Bantam Books, ISBN 0-553-23337-8, Publication date October 1983, mass market paperback. Yvonne Gilbert (front cover illustrator).
- 1986, UK, Methuen, ISBN 0-413-51350-5, Publication date November 1986, mass market paperback.
- 1987, USA, Bantam Books, ISBN 0-553-26586-5, Publication date April 1987, mass market paperback.
- 1990, USA, Bantam Books, ISBN 0-553-26586-5, Publication date November 1990, mass market paperback. Tom Canty (front cover illustrator).
- 1994, USA, Bantam, ISBN 0-553-37397-8, Pub date September 1994, hardcover. Gary A. Lippincott (illustrator).
- 1997, USA, Easton Press Masterpieces of Fantasy, hardcover.
- 1997, USA, Bantam /Science Fiction Book Club, ISBN 1-56865-429-4, Publication date August 1997, hardcover. Gary A. Lippincott (illustrator).
- 2000, UK, Orion Books, ISBN 1-85798-711-X, Pub date May 2000, trade paperback, volume 5 of the Fantasy Masterworks series.
- 2002, USA, Harper Perennial, ISBN 0-06-093793-9, Publication date March 2002, trade paperback.
- 2006, USA, Harper Perennial Modern Classics, ISBN 0-06-112005-7, Publication date October 2006, trade paperback.
- 2011, USA, Blackstone Audio, ISBN 978-1-4417-3392-4 (CD) and ISBN 978-1-4417-3395-5 (MP3-CD), Publication date December 2011, audiobook. Read by the author, from the "Author's Preferred Text" created for the Incunabula edition.
- 2022, USA, Incunabula, ISBN 978-0-9633-6375-6 (trade edition), ISBN 978-0-9633-6376-3 (numbered edition), ISBN 978-0-9633-6377-0 (lettered edition). Hardcover, nominally the 25th-anniversary edition with an afterword by Harold Bloom. Illustrations by Peter Milton.
