= The Joker of Seville =

The Joker of Seville is an epithet for Don Juan. It can refer to:

- The Joker of Seville (Walcott), a 1974 play by Derek Walcott
- The Joker of Seville and the Stone Guest, a work by Tirso de Molina
