= Andrés de Claramonte =

Playwright of the Spanish Golden Age

Andrés de Claramonte y Corroy (Murcia c. 1580 – September 19, 1626) was a playwright of the Spanish Golden Age. Very few facts are known about his life. As an actor, he worked for the most important companies, such as Baltasar de Pinedo's or Alonso de Olmedo's. As a playwright, he wrote dramas with great epic style, in which he showed his talent for visual and theatrical effects.

== Major works ==
Five of Claramonte's plays, among those that are of undisputed authorship, have attracted most critical attention: Deste agua no beberé, El nuevo rey Gallinato, La infelice Dorotea, El secreto en la mujer, and El valiente negro en Flandes.

Deste agua no beberé is a tense and dramatically striking honor play, featuring King Pedro I who was called both "el cruel" (the cruel one) and "el justiciero" (the just). In spite of forebodings, he chooses to rest at don Gutierre's castle. Even though he is away, his wife, Mencía asks him to spend the night. The king is so bold as to enter her bedroom and offer to kill her husband and make her Queen. When she rejects him, his cruel side of his personality is unleashed as he tries by several means to have her dishonored and killed. As opposed to most honor plays, this one ends when, being shown his many mistakes, the King reunites Gutierre and Mencia.

El nuevo rey Gallinato is best known for being one of the few plays of the Golden Age that include a voyage to American. In addition, critics such as Frederick A. de Armas and Miguel Zugasti have remarked that there is a confused geography as lands from America and Asia are juxtaposed.

La infelice Dorotea deals with the tragic fate of Garcinuñez, Dorotea and Fernando, the first being upset from the start at a Moor's prediction, in the manner of magical words upon a wall. As Charles Ganelin points out, it is a play about astrological prediction, the reverses of fortune and the workings of poetic justice.

Forebodings are also important in El secreto en la mujer. Here, Lelio breaks all three commands given by his father, and this leads inexorably to his doom.

El valiente negro en Flandes is the work by Claramonte that has elicited most responses. It deals with the valor of a black slave. Manuel Olmedo Gobante, for example, discusses Afro-Hispanic swordsmen in the context of Claramonte's play.

== Other dramatic plays ==
A less-known play by Claramonte is El Gran rey de los desiertos, San Onofre (The great king of the deserts, Saint Onuphrius), which is evidently related to El Condenado por desconfiado, as has been shown by Ciriaco Moron and Alfredo Rodriguez Lopez-Vazquez. In 2008 Alejandro Garcia Reidy discovered an unpublished play by Claramonte, Las dos columnas de San Carlos, in which is shown Charles Borromeo's life, a play that has the particularity to have in the first scene the character of Martin Luther.

== Critic's considerations about Claramonte ==
The Spanish Scholar Marcelino Menendez y Pelayo looked down on Claramonte, but nowadays he has been reconsidered by the critics, particularly Alfredo Rodriguez Lopez-Vazquez, Charles V. Ganelin, Frederick A. de Armas and Fernando Cantalapiedra Erostarbe. Some of these support the idea that he wrote some of the most important plays of the Spanish Golden.

Although attributed to Lope de Vega, The Star of Seville was first considered to be the work of Claramonte by Sturgis E. Leavitt, in his 1931 book. A symposium on the play held at Pennsylvania State University some sixty years later, in 1992, paved the way for the reconsideration of this play his in the United States. A book based on the findings edited by Frederick A. de Armas was published in 1996

The Trickster of Seville which was traditionally attributed to Tirso de Molina is now considered to have been penned by Claramonte. Leading this claim is Alfredo Rodrigues Lopez-Vazquez whose edition in Cátedra has changed the perception of a number of critics.

== Studies ==
- Fernando Cantalapiedra Erostarbe, 'El infanzón de Illescas' y las comedias de Claramonte, Kassel, Edition Reichenberger / Universidad de Granada, 1990, 282 págs.
- Fernando Cantalapiedra Erostarbe, El teatro de Claramonte y La Estrella de Sevilla, Kassel, Edition Reichenberger, 1993, 441 págs,
- Frederick A. de Armas, “Oikoumene: la geografía híbrida de El (nuevo) rey Gallinato de Andrés de Claramante,” Teatro 15, 2001, pp. 37-48.
- Frederick A. de Armas, Heavenly Bodies: The Realms of "La estrella de Sevilla", Lewisbugh, Bucknell University Press, 1996.
- Frederick A. de Armas, "Letters that Heal/Kill in Claramonte's El secreto en la mujer," The Golden Age Comedia: Text, Theory and Performance, eds. Charles Ganelin and Howard Mancing. West Lafayette, IN, Purdue University Press, 1994.
- Frederick A. de Armas, "Woman, Saturn and Melancholia in Claramonte's La estrella de Sevilla," Journal of Interdisciplinary Literary Studies6, 1994.
- Frederick de Armas, “‘A King is He...:’ Seneca, Covarrubias and Deste agua no beberé ,” Neophilologus 74, 1990, pp. 374-82.
- Charles Ganelin, "Astrology, Poetic Justice and Providence in Andres de Claramonte's La infelice Dorotea," Bulletin of the Comediantes, 39.2, 1987, pp. 215-23.
- Alejandro García-Reidy, "Una comedia inédita de Andrés de Claramonte: San Carlos o Las dos columnas de Carlos, Criticón, 102, 2008, pp. 177-193.
- Sturgis E. Leavitt, "La estrella de Sevilla" and Claramonte, Cambridge, Harvard University Press, 1931.
- Manuel Olmedo Gobantes, “El mucho número que hay dellos: El valiente negro en Flandesy los esgrimistas afrohispanos de Grandezas de la espada,” Bulletin of the Comediantes 70.2, 2018, pp. 67–92.
- Alfredo Rodríguez López-Vázquez, “Ulises, Jasón, Eneas y el mito de don Juan: la ‘hipótesis grecolatina’ y la obra de Claramonte,” Ecos y resplandores helenos en la literatura hispana. Siglos XVI al XXI, eds. Tatiana Alvarado Teodorika, Theodora Grigoriadou, Fernando García Romero. Sociedad Boliviana de Estudios Clásicos / Sociedad Española de Estudios Clásicos, 2018, pp. 277-90.
- Alfredo Rodríguez López-Vázquez, Andres de Claramonte y "El burlador de Sevilla" Kassel: Ed. Reichenberger, 1987.
- Alfredo Rodríguez López-Vázquez, Alfredo. Aportaciones críticas a la autoría de "El burlador de Sevilla". Criticón 40, 1987, pp. 5–44.
- Alfredo Rodríguez López-Vázquez, Alfredo. "La Estrella de Sevilla" y Claramonte. Criticón, 21, 1983, pp. 5–31.
- Luis Vázquez, "Andrés de Claramonte (1580? -1626), la Merced, Tirso de Molina y El burlador de Sevilla (Anotaciones críticas ante un intento de usurpación literaria)", Estudios, 151, 1985, pp. 397–429.
- Luis Vázquez, "Documentos toledanos y madrileños de Claramonte y reafirmación de Tirso como autor de El burlador de Sevilla y convidado de piedra", Estudios, 156-157, 1987, pp. 9–50.
- Christopher B. Weimer, "Andrés de Claramonte y Corroy (1580?-1626)," Spanish Dramatists of the Golden Age: A Bio-Bibliographical Source Book, ed. Mary Parker. Westport, CT and London, Greenwood Press, 1998, pp 75-86.
- Miguel Zugasti, “Pegú o Perú: espacio imaginario y espacio real en El nuevo rey Gallinato de Claramonte,” Loca Ficta: Los espacios de la maravilla en la Edad Media y Siglo de Oro. Ed. Ignacio Arellano Ayuso. Navarra: Universidad de Navarra, 2003, pp. 439-58.

== Editions ==
- Andres de Claramonte, El ataúd para el vivo y el tálamo para el muerto, ed. Alfredo Rodríguez Lopez-Vázquez. London, Tamesis, 1993.
- Andres de Claramonte, Deste agua no beberé, ed. Alfredo Rodríguez Lopez-Vázquez. Kassel, Reichenberger, 1984.
- Andres de Claramonte, La estrella de Sevilla, ed. Alfredo Rodríguez Lopez-Vázquez. Madrid, Cátedra, 1991.
- Andres de Claramonte, La infelice Dorotea, ed. Charles Ganelin. London, Tamesis, 1987.
- Andrés de Claramonte, El secreto en la mujer ed. Alfredo Rodríguez Lopez-Vázquez. London, Tamesis, 1991.
- Andres de Claramonte, Púsoseme el sol, salióme la luna, ed. Alfredo Rodríguez Lopez-Vázquez. Kassel, Reichenberger, 1985.
- Andrés de Claramonte: "Tan largo me lo fiáis", "Deste agua no beberé", Madrid: Ed. Cátedra, Letras Hispánicas, 2008.
- Atribuido a Tirso de Molina/ Luis Vélez, "El condenado por desconfiado" "La ninfa del Cielo", Madrid: Cátedra, Letras Hispánicas, 2008.
- Atribuido a Tirso de Molina, "El burlador de Sevilla", Madrid:Ed. Cátedra, Letras Hispánicas, 2007 (15 edición).
- Nelson López, "El valiente negro en Flandes: Edición para actores y directores" Kassel, Edition Reichenberger, 2008.
