= The Walls Have Ears =

Play written by Juan Ruiz de Alarcón

The Walls Have Ears (Spanish: Las paredes oyen) is a play written by the Spanish playwright Juan Ruiz de Alarcón. It was first staged in 1617, but it was not published until 1628 in the first part of Alarcón's collected plays. A manuscript of the work was discovered in 1882 in the Library of the Duke of Osuna. It is one of Alarcón's best known plays.

== Plot ==
The play features two parallel plots dealing with rivalries in love. It contains disguises, duels and complex intrigues.

The main plot revolves around Doña Ana de Contreras who is courted by both Don Juan and Don Mendo. While the latter is portrayed as handsome and dashing, his tricks and calumnies directed at his rival point to his negative side. Don Juan, on the other hand, is an impoverished nobleman, who depicts himself as unattractive and not worthy of Ana's Diana-like beauty. As the action advances, Juan proves himself to be forthright and persevering. At first, Doña Ana intends to marry Don Mendo, not realizing his many flaws, but she slowly begins to suspect that he is not what he seems. In Act II, after undertaking some devotional rituals in honor of San Diego, she returns home early to hear Don Mendo disparage her in front of Don Juan, who defends her. In Act III don Mendo decides to counter her growing indifference and even dislike, by forcing himself upon her. This turns her completely against him.

The secondary plot involves Don Mendo's mendacity as he tries to hide from Lucrecia the fact that he is scheming to marry Ana. Lucrecia is also courted by a Count who seeks to enlighten her about Mendo. While the action begins with a passionate and irrational love on the part of both Ana and Lucrecia, it ends with rational love based on the qualities of the men they eventually choose to marry: Juan and the Count. The denouement of the main plot shows how don Mendo's predilection for slanderous remarks cause him to lose the love of Ana and Lucrecia as well as the friendship and patronage of the Duke of Urbino."

== Adaptations ==
In 1974, a French adaptation was created by Eduardo Manet, and titled L'Autre Don Juan.

== Notes ==
- ARELLANO, Ignacio, El teatro en la Hispanoamérica colonial, Madrid, Iberoamericana, 2008.
- ASCHOM, B. B. “Three Notes on Las paredes oyen,” Hispanic Review 15 (1947): 378–84.
- BUXÓ, José Pascual, Permanencia y destino de la literatura novohispana: historia y crítica, México, UNAM, 2006.
- DE ARMAS, Frederick A., "El sol sale a medianoche: amor y astrología en Las paredes oyen," Criticón 59 (1993): 119–26.
- FERNÁNDEZ, Sergio, Los empeños: ensayos en homenaje a Juan Ruiz de Alarcón, México, UNAM, 1998.
- GARZA CUARÓN, Beatriz, Historia de la literatura mexicana: desde sus orígenes hasta nuestros días, vol. 2, México: Siglo XXI, 1996.
- JOSA, Lola, El arte dramático de Juan Ruiz de Alarcón, Madrid, Reichenberger, 2003.
- KING, Willard F., Juan Ruiz de Alarcón: letrado y dramaturgo, México: Colegio de México, 1989.
- PARR, James A. "Virtus, Honor, Noblesse Oblige: La verdad sospechosa and Las paredes oyen as Companion Pieces,” After Its Kind. Approaches to the Comedia, eds. Matthew D. Stroud, Anne M.Pasero y Amy R. Williamsen, Kassel, Reichenberger, 1991: 22–36.
- REVUELTAS, Eugenia, El discurso de Juan Ruiz de Alarcón, Morelia, El Colegio de Michoacán, 1999.
