= Tirso de Molina =

Spanish friar and dramatist (1583–1648)

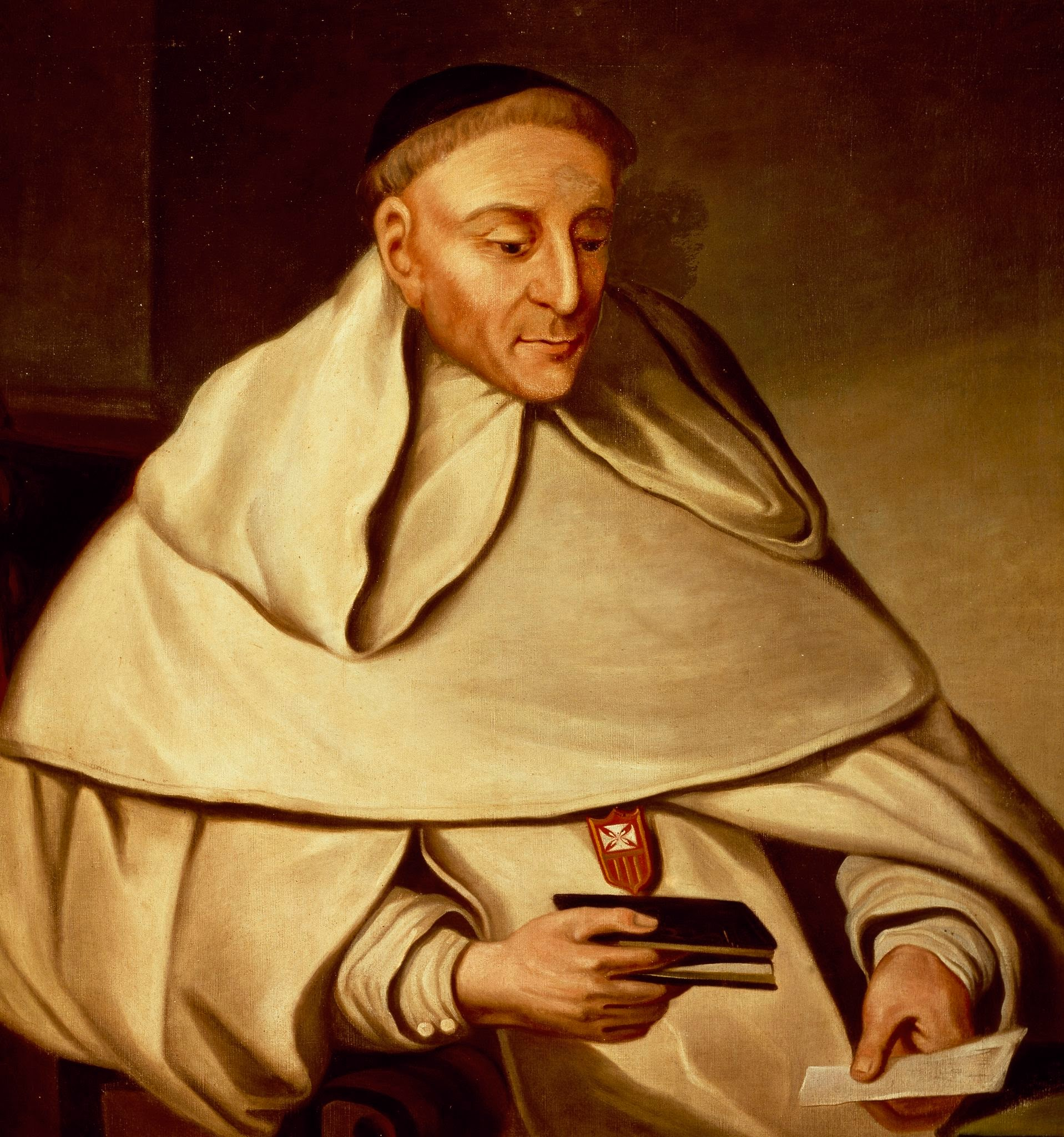
- Born: Gabriel José López y Telléz; 24 March 1579 Madrid, Spain
- Died: 20 February 1648 (aged 64) Almazán, Spain
- Occupation: Dramatist, poet, Mercedarian friar, and Catholic priest
- Period: Spanish Golden Age
- Literary movement: Baroque
- Notable works: The Trickster of Seville and the Stone Guest
- Parents: Andrés López and Juana Téllez (née López)

Gabriel Téllez, O. de M. (24 March 1583 – 20 February 1648), also known as Tirso de Molina, was a Spanish Baroque dramatist and poet, as well as a Mercedarian friar, and Catholic priest. He is primarily known for writing The Trickster of Seville and the Stone Guest, the play from which the character Don Juan originates. His work also includes female protagonists and the exploration of sexual issues.

== Life and career ==
Gabriel Téllez was born in Madrid to Andrés López and Juana Téllez, servants of the Count of Molina. As a youth, he studied at the University of Alcalá. He joined the mendicant Order of Our Lady of Mercy on 4 November 1600, by whom he was sent to the Monastery of San Antolín at Guadalajara to begin his period of novitiate on 21 January 1601. He had been ordained as a priest by 1610.

Téllez had been writing plays for ten years when he was sent by his superiors on a mission to the West Indies in 1615; as a result, he resided in the Spanish colony of Santo Domingo from 1616 to 1618. After returning to Europe, he resided at the Mercedarian monastery in Madrid, where he took part in the proceedings of the Medrano Academy, competed in the literary tournaments, and wrote for the stage.

Tellez' first publication, the incomplete Cigarrales de Toledo (a work licensed in 1621, but not published until 1624), is a miscellany of short tales, novellas, verses, and three plays. One of the novellas, Los tres maridos burlados, which may have been derived from Francesco Cieco da Ferrara's Mambriano, and the play entitled El vergonzoso en palacio are considered to demonstrate wit and ingenuity. The preface to Cigarrales de Toledo states that Tirso de Molina had already written three hundred plays.

Téllez opposed culteranismo in the Cigarrales de Toledo, and made enemies through his attacks on it in pieces such as Amar por arte mayor and La celosa de si misma. The tone of some of his productions caused his rivals to denounce him as a corrupter of public morals to the Council of Castile in 1625, and, though no legal action was taken against him, he may have been reprimanded privately. In 1626, it was thought to be advisable to transfer him to Salamanca, thus Téllez left Madrid, determined not to write anything more for the stage. Although one of his plays, La huerta de San Juan, is dated as being written in 1626, there is no proof that he started writing it after his departure from Madrid, and it is suspected that he did not write anything for eight years.

Téllez, however, had not lost his interest in theatre, having published twelve representative pieces as the first part of his dramatic works (1626). At the same time, he continued to serve his Order, being named the prior of the monastery at Trujillo in 1626; he was elected later to the posts of reader in theology and Definitor General, and, in May 1632, he was appointed the official archivist of the Order.

His Deleitar aprovechando, which was published in 1635, is a counterpart of the Cigarrales de Toledo. A sequel was promised to this collection of tales, lyrics, and autos, but, as in the case of the Cigarrales de Toledo, the continuation never appeared.

Twelve plays constitute the third part of his dramatic works published in 1634; the plays were supposedly edited by the writer's nephew, Francisco Lucas de Ávila; however, Ávila may have been a cover identity for himself. The second section of the plays (1635), the printing of which was paid for by the Confraternity of St. Jerome, contains four plays by Téllez, and eight written by him in collaboration with other dramatists, including Juan Ruiz de Alarcón; however, Tirso de Molina still did the majority of the writing. The fourth and fifth compilations of his dramatic works (1635 and 1636) each contain twelve plays; the haste with which these five volumes were issued may indicate the author's desire to save some part of his work from destruction, and the appearance of his nephew's name on the titlepages of the last four volumes may indicate his desire to avoid conflict with the authorities. A sixth volume of dramatic pieces, consisting of comedies, was announced; however, the project was abandoned.

Dramatic composition may have still been a part of Tirso's leisure as he grew older, as indicated by how the fragmentary autograph copy of Las quinas de Portugal is dated 8 March 1638, despite the fact that his active career as a dramatist ended two years earlier. He was absorbed by other duties. As official archivist of his order, he compiled the elaborate Historia de la Merced (his religious order), which occupied him until 24 December 1639, and which was not published until 1973. As a tribute to the Count de Sastago, who had accepted the dedication of the fourth part of the plays, and who may have helped to defray the publishing expenses, Tirso de Molina is said to have compiled the Genealogía de la casa de Sastago (1640), but the ascription of this genealogical work is disputed.

On 29 September 1645, Tirso de Molina was appointed as the prior of the monastery at Soria, where he died.

== Legacy ==
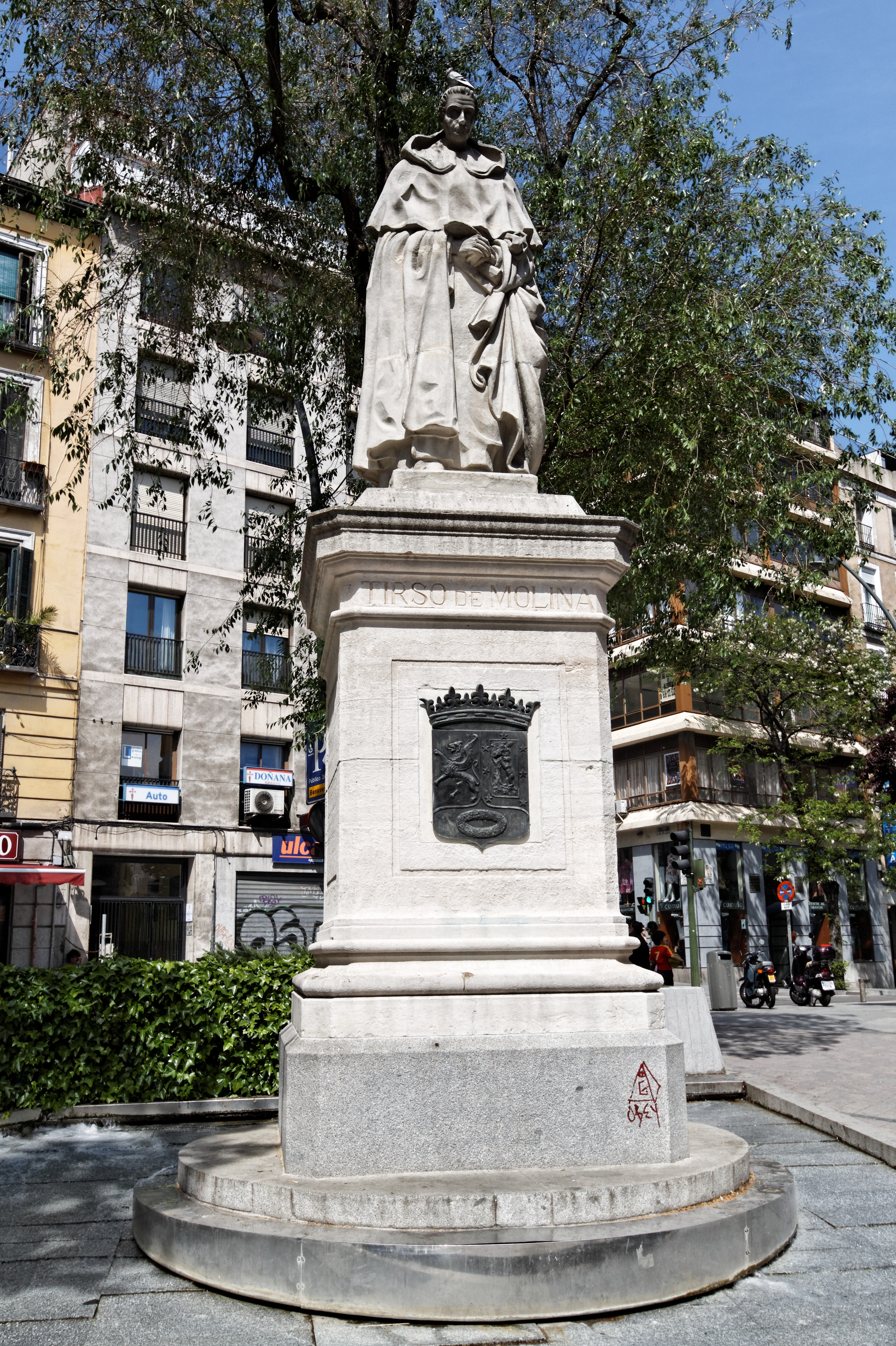
Monument to Tirso de Molina in Madrid (R. Vela, 1943)

It is only within the last century that it has become possible to give an outline of his life and only a fraction of his plays have been preserved. The earliest of his extant pieces is dated 1605; in 1624, he had written three hundred plays, and in 1634, he stated that he had composed four hundred within the previous twenty years; however, not more than eighty of his plays are currently in existence. Tirso de Molina is known as the author of The Trickster of Seville and the Stone Guest, the piece in which Don Juan is first presented onstage. However, whether or not other works are correctly attributed to him is disputed; as thought by scholars such as Fernando Cantalapiedra and Alfredo Rodríguez, El Burlador de Sevilla and El Condenado por desconfiado may have been written by Andrés de Claramonte.

His works cover multiple genres and scenarios. El Condenado por desconfiado describes a philosophical enigma, while Prudence in Woman is a historical interpretation. Averígüelo Vargas and La villana de Vallecas (The Peasant Woman of Vallecas) write about female characters.

His reputation may have extended beyond the Pyrenees in his own lifetime, as indicated by how James Shirley's Opportunity is derived from El Castigo del penséque; however, his name was almost forgotten until the end of the 18th century, when some of his pieces were recast by Dionisio Solís and later by Juan Carretero.

The height of his fame occurred between 1839 and 1842, when an incomplete edition of his plays was published by Juan Eugenio Hartzenbusch. He is now accepted as one of the greatest dramatists of Spain.

In 2012, Tirso's Condenado por Desconfiado was performed as Damned by Despair at the Olivier Theatre in London, in a new version by Frank McGuinness.

== Works ==
=== Drama ===
==== Morality Plays ====
- El colmenero divino (1613)
- No le arriendo la ganancia (1613)
- La madrina del cielo (1613)
- Los hermanos parecidos (1615)
- El laberinto de Creta

==== Cloak and Dagger Comedies ====
- El vergonzoso en palacio (1611)
- El Melancólico (1611)
- Cómo han de ser los amigos (1612)
- La villana de la Sagra (1612)
- El castigo del penseque (1614)
- Quien calla otorga (1614)
- Marta la piadosa (1614)
- Don Gil de las calzas verdes (1615)
- Amar por señas (1615)
- El amor médico (1620)
- La celosa de sí misma (1620)
- La villana de Vallecas (1620)
- Celos con celos se curan (1621)
- Por el sótano y el torno (1623)
- Los balcones de Madrid (1624)
- Amar por razón de estado (1625)
- No hay peor sordo (1626)
- Desde Toledo a Madrid (1626)
- La huerta de Juan Fernández (1626)
- Amar por arte mayor (1630)
- Privar contra su gusto (1632)
- La firmeza en la hermosura (1644)

==== Historical Comedies ====
- La república al revés (1611)
- La dama del olivar (1614)
- Amor y celos hacen discretos (1615)
- Los amantes de Teruel (1615)
- Averígüelo Vargas (1621)
- Antona García (1622)
- La prudencia en la mujer (1622), about the queen María de Molina
- Trilogía de los Pizarros (1626-1632)
- Las quinas de Portugal (1638)

==== Mythological Comedies ====
- El Aquiles (1612)
- La fingida Arcadia (1621)

==== Religious and Philosophical Comedies ====
- La joya de las montañas (c. 1605)
- Los lagos de San Vicente (1607)
- La gallega Mari-Hernández (1611)
- La peña de Francia (1612)
- La mujer que manda en casa (1612), about Jezabel
- La ninfa del cielo (1613)
- Trilogy «La santa Juana» (1613-1614)
- Tanto es lo de más como lo de menos (1614)
- La mejor espigadera (1614), about Ruth
- El condenado por desconfiado (1615)
- La vida y muerte de Herodes (1615)
- Quien no cae, no se levanta (1624)
- El mayor desengaño (1621)
- La venganza de Tamar (1621)
- El burlador de Sevilla (1612-1620)

=== Prose ===
- Los cigarrales de Toledo (1621)
- Historia general de la Orden de Nuestra Señora de la Merced (1637)
- Deleitar aprovechando (1635)
- Genealogía del conde de Sástago (1640)
- Vida de la Santa Madre doña María de Cerbellón, discovered and published in 1908 by Marcelino Menéndez Pelayo.

== Bibliography ==
- Tirso De Molina. Bedrageren Fra Sevilla Og Stengæsten [The Trickster of Seville and the Stone Guest]. Translated by Sanne Bertram. Stauer Publishing. ISBN 9788792510389.
- Comedias escogidas
- Comedias
- El Teatro del Maestro Tirso de Molina
- Tirso de Molina; investigaciones bio-bibliográficas
- Estudios de crítica literaria
- Discurso ante la Real Academía española
- El Condenado por desconfiado and "Más sobre las fuentes del Condenado por desconfiado"
- Etudes sur l'Espagne
