= Hippolyte-Julien-Joseph Lucas =

French writer

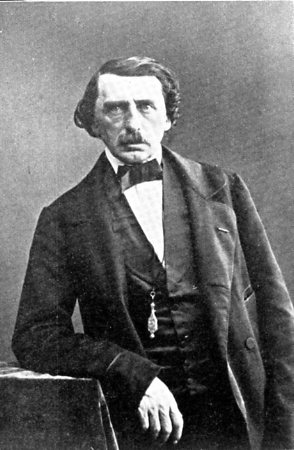
Hippolyte Lucas

Hippolyte-Julien-Joseph Lucas (20 December 1807, Rennes – 16 November 1878, Paris) was a French writer and critic whose literary output was largely centered on theatre and opera.

He was the author of several plays and opera libretti. In addition to his original stage works, Lucas also translated plays and libretti by other authors for performances in French. These included plays by Aristophanes, Euripides, Lope de Vega, and Calderón as well as Donizetti's operas Belisario, Maria Padilla, and Linda di Chamounix. He was the editor of Le Siècle, but his literary and theatrical criticism appeared in many other French journals as well, most notably L'Artiste, La Minerve, and Le Charivari. He was also a bookseller and later served as the librarian of the Bibliothèque de l'Arsenal. French composer Jeanne Rivet used Lucas’ text for her song “La plus jolie Maison de France.”

== Principal works ==
Opera libretti

- L'étoile de Seville, grand opéra in four acts, composed by Michael Balfe, 1845
- La bouquetière, opera in one act, composed by Adolphe Adam, 1847
- Le siège de Leyde, opera in four acts composed by Charles-Louis-Adolphe Vogel, 1847
- La Saint-André ou L'orpheline bretonne, opera in one act composed by Giovanni Luigi Bazzoni, 1849
- Lalla-Roukh (with Michel Carré), opéra comique in two acts, composed by Félicien David, 1862
- Fior d'Aliza (with Michel Carré), opéra comique in four acts, composed by Victor Massé, 1866
- Les parias, opera in 3 acts, composed by Edmond Membrée, 1874

Non-fiction

- Caractères et portraits de femmes, Brussels: Meline, 1836
- Histoire philosophique et littéraire du théatre français: depuis son origine jusqu'à nos jours, Paris: Gosselin, 1843
- Curiosités dramatiques et littéraires, Paris: Garnier frères, 1855

Poetry

- Heures d'amour, Paris: Chez Jules Gay, 1864.
- Chants de divers pays (previously unpublished poems published posthumously by his son, Léo Lucas, and Olivier de Gourcuff. Nantes: Société des bibliophiles bretons et de l'histoire de Bretagne, 1893
