= Jeanne Rivet =

Jeanne Rivet (1850–1913) was a French composer of songs and music for piano. Her compositions were widely published during her lifetime.

Little is known about Rivet's life. The composer Justin Clerice dedicated his Menuet No. 3 to her in 1890. Rivet set texts by the following writers to music: Raoul de Bionnet, Hann de Crillon, Henri David as Henri Darsay, Julia Daudet, Maurice Faure, Francois I, Goran, Ernest Lourdelet, Hippolyte Julien Joseph Lucas, Jean Richepin, Gustave Rivet, Armand Silvestre, Paul Sonnies, André Theuriet, Georges Trouillot, and Paul Verlaine.

Rivet's works were published by Casa Ricordi, Choudens, Grus (today Lemoine), Hachette, and Edouard Moulle. Her compositions include:

== Piano ==
- Mystere d’Orient
- Roses Rouges

== Vocal ==
- “Apaisement” (text by Henri David as Henri Darsay)
- “Aubade a l’amour” (text by Henri David as Henri Darsay)
- “Ave Maria”
- “Ballade Bretonne” (text by André Theuriet)
- “Berceuse pour chant et piano” (text by Ernest Lourdelet)
- “Ciel est d’azur” (text by Paul Sonnies)
- “Cloches: Chanson de lat Toussaint” (text by Hann de Crillon)
- “Conte Foi” (text by Raoul de Bionnet)
- “En Partant pour la Guerre” (text by Georges Trouillot)
- “Green” (text by Paul Verlaine)
- “Je le Veux, Cette Fleur” (text by Gorlan)
- “Je t’attends!” (text by Gustave Rivet)
- “La plus jolie Maison de France” (text by Hippolyte Lucas)
- “Le Bateau Rose” (text by Jean Richepin)
- “Les Avions!” (text by Gustave Rivet)
- “Les Ombres Dansent” (text by Ernest Lourdelet)
- “Lettre d’amour de la Tranchee” (text by Gustav Rivet)
- “Mon Amour est Comme un Oiseau”
- “Mort de la Cigale” (text by Maurice Faure)
- “Noel” (text by Gustav Rivet)
- “Notre Amour” (text by Armand Silvestre)
- “Ou estes-vous allez?” (text by Francois I)
- “Pensee Matinale” (text by Julia Daudet)
- “Two Melodies: Baisers and Quand Mai Fleurit”
