= L'étoile de Séville =

L'Étoile de Séville
- Grand opera by Michael William Balfe
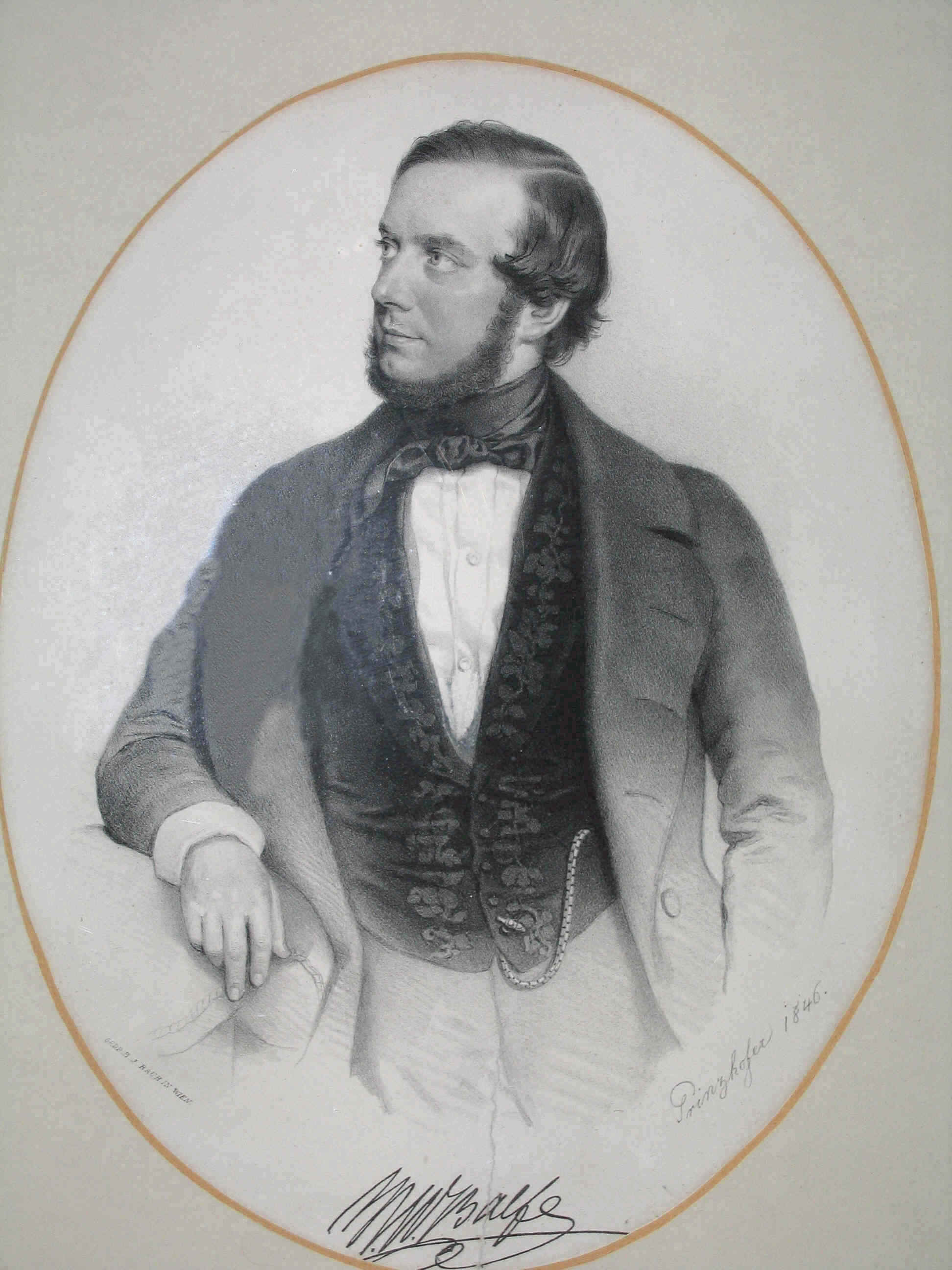
- The composer in 1846
- Translation: The Star of Seville
- Librettist: Hippolyte Lucas
- Language: French
- Based on: La Estrella de Sevilla by Andrés de Claramonte
- Premiere: 17 December 1845; Salle Le Peletier, Paris

L'Étoile de Séville (The Star of Seville) is a grand opéra in four acts composed by Michael William Balfe to a libretto by Hippolyte Lucas based on Andrés de Claramonte's 1623 play La Estrella de Sevilla. It premiered at the Théâtre de l'Académie Royale de Musique in Paris on 17 December 1845 with Rosine Stoltz in the title role.

== Roles ==
Roles, voice types, premiere cast
Roles	Voice type	Premiere cast 17 December 1845, Conductor: François Habeneck
Estrella	soprano	Rosine Stoltz
Zaïda	soprano	Marie-Dolorès Nau
Don Sanche	tenor	Italo Gardoni
Don Bustos	tenor	Hippolyte Brémont
Pedro	tenor	Paulin
King	baritone	Paul Barroilhet
Don Arias	bass	Joseph Menghis
Gomez	bass	Ferdinand Prévôt
