= Don Gil of the Green Breeches =

Literary work

Don Gil of the Green Breeches (Spanish: Don Gil de las calzas verdes) is a 1615 comedy by the Spanish playwright Tirso de Molina. It was premiered in Toledo, at the Mesón de la Fruta, in July 1615 and was first published in 1635.
