= Prudence in Woman =

1634 play written by Tirso de Molina

- Original language: Spanish
- Written by: Tirso de Molina

Prudence in Woman (Spanish: La prudencia en la mujer) is a play written by the Spanish playwright Tirso de Molina. It was written around 1621 and 1623, and was published in the third part of Tirso's works (Madrid, 1634).

Prudence in Woman is a history play that foregrounds the role of María de Molina, the widow of King Sancho IV of Spain, as she became regent during her son's childhood, and had to face innumerable problems to retain power. In this play Tirso re-works another one of his historical dramas, La república al revés where Irene is regent of the Byzantine Empire. Prudence in Woman then highlights the role of the mother, which is a figure that is often absent in early modern Spanish plays. Her actions show her to be a chaste widow, a prudent woman (at a time when women were often described as fickle and impetuous), and a wise ruler. The work begins with the Queen in a tight situation as three noblemen, Don Juan, Don Diego y don Enrique, wish to take control, or at the very least marry this widow. María de Molina also has to contend with the rivalry between her loyal subjects, the Benavides and the Carvajales. She claims that her ability to stand up to her foes is because she has three souls: that of her departed husband; that of her persecuted child; and her own. Throughout the first act the Queen seeks to represent or portray her child not only as the rightful heir but also as a Christ figure.

In spite of her generous and upright behavior, the second act shows that her main antagonist, don Juan, is still plotting against her. Making use of a Jewish doctor, he seeks to poison the child-king. In a scene that has antisemitic overtones, the doctor seeks to avenge himself on all Christians. But as he tries to enter the boy's room, the Queen's portrait falls at his feet, blocking the way. The portrait then becomes a kind of religious icon that performs the "miracle" of saving the future king. This scene may have been borrowed from Salucio del Poyo's Próspera fortuna de Ruy López Dávalos. Here, it attains an even greater significance. The generous and virtuous Queen becomes more and more an image of the Virgin Mary, while her son is Christ persecuted by Herod. The regent administers swift punishment as the Jewish doctor is made to drink the poison. On the other hand, don Juan is simply reprimanded. At the end of Act Two María de Molina must again admonish her enemies as they partake of a bountiful banquet while her treasury is empty. The third act shows how Fernando IV, now King, falls for the evil advice of his enemies. Their gossip and self-interest contrasts with María de Molina's virtue and her attempts to bring harmony to the kingdom. She will once again come to the rescue, teaching the king and her courtiers through example. For some, then, the play is a mirror of princes that attempts to educate Philip IV, the King in power at the time the play was written.
