= Lalla-Roukh =

1862 comic opera by Félicien David

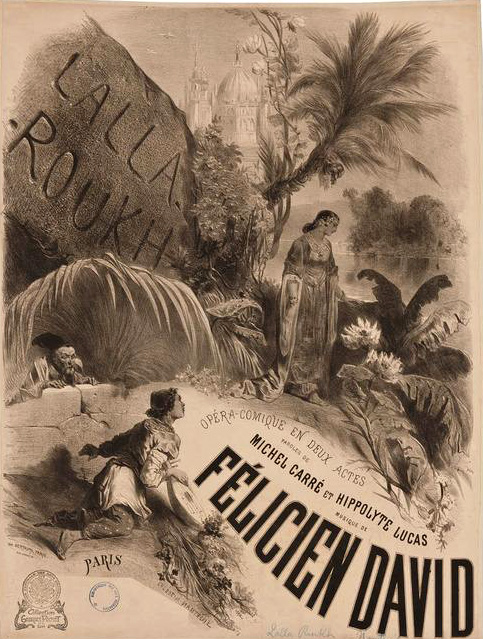
Poster by Célestin Nanteuil for the premiere of Lalla-Roukh

Lalla-Roukh is an opéra comique in two acts composed by Félicien David. The libretto by Michel Carré and Hippolyte Lucas was based on Thomas Moore's 1817 narrative poem Lalla Rookh. It was first performed on 12 May 1862 by the Opéra-Comique at the Salle Favart in Paris. Set in Kashmir and Samarkand, the opera recounts the love story between Nourreddin, the King of Samarkand, and the Mughal princess Lalla-Roukh. Her name means "Tulip-cheeked", a frequent term of endearment in Persian poetry.

== Performance history ==
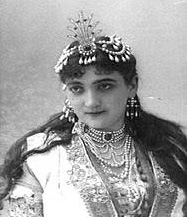
Emma Calvé as Lalla-Roukh, 1885

Lalla-Roukh had its world premiere on 12 May 1862 at the Opéra-Comique (Salle Favart) in Paris in a double bill with Pierre-Alexandre Monsigny's Rose et Colas, a one-act mêlée d'ariettes. The mise en scène was by Ernest Mocker, the settings by Jean-Pierre Moynet, Charles Cambon, and Joseph Thierry, and the costumes by Jules Marre. An immediate success with the Paris audiences, Lalla-Roukh was very popular in its day, with 100 performances at the Opéra-Comique in the year following its premiere. It was revived several more times by the company, including performances in 1876, 1885 (with Emma Calvé in the title role), and 1898, receiving its 376th and last performance on 29 May.

The opera was soon presented in other French-language theatres, including those in Liège (20 October 1862), Brussels (27 October 1862), Antwerp (29 October 1862), Geneva (19 January 1864), and other cities, as well as the Opéra de Monte-Carlo in 1886 and 1888. It was translated into German and performed in cities such as Coburg (25 December 1862), Mainz (26 December 1862), Munich (16 March 1863), Vienna (22 April 1863), and Berlin (Meysels-Theater, 7 August 1865), and even translated into Hungarian (presented in Budapest, 31 January 1863), Polish (Warsaw, 8 March 1866), Swedish (Stockholm, 12 January 1870), Italian (Milan, Teatro Re, 7 September 1870), and Russian (St. Petersburg, 5 February 1884; Moscow, 10 February 1896).

Lalla-Roukh sank into obscurity in the 20th century although individual arias and its overture were occasionally performed at concerts and recitals. Larger extracts from the opera were given concert performances in 1976 at Cadenet (David's birthplace) and in 2008 at the National Gallery of Art in Washington, D.C., performed by Opera Lafayette.

== Roles ==
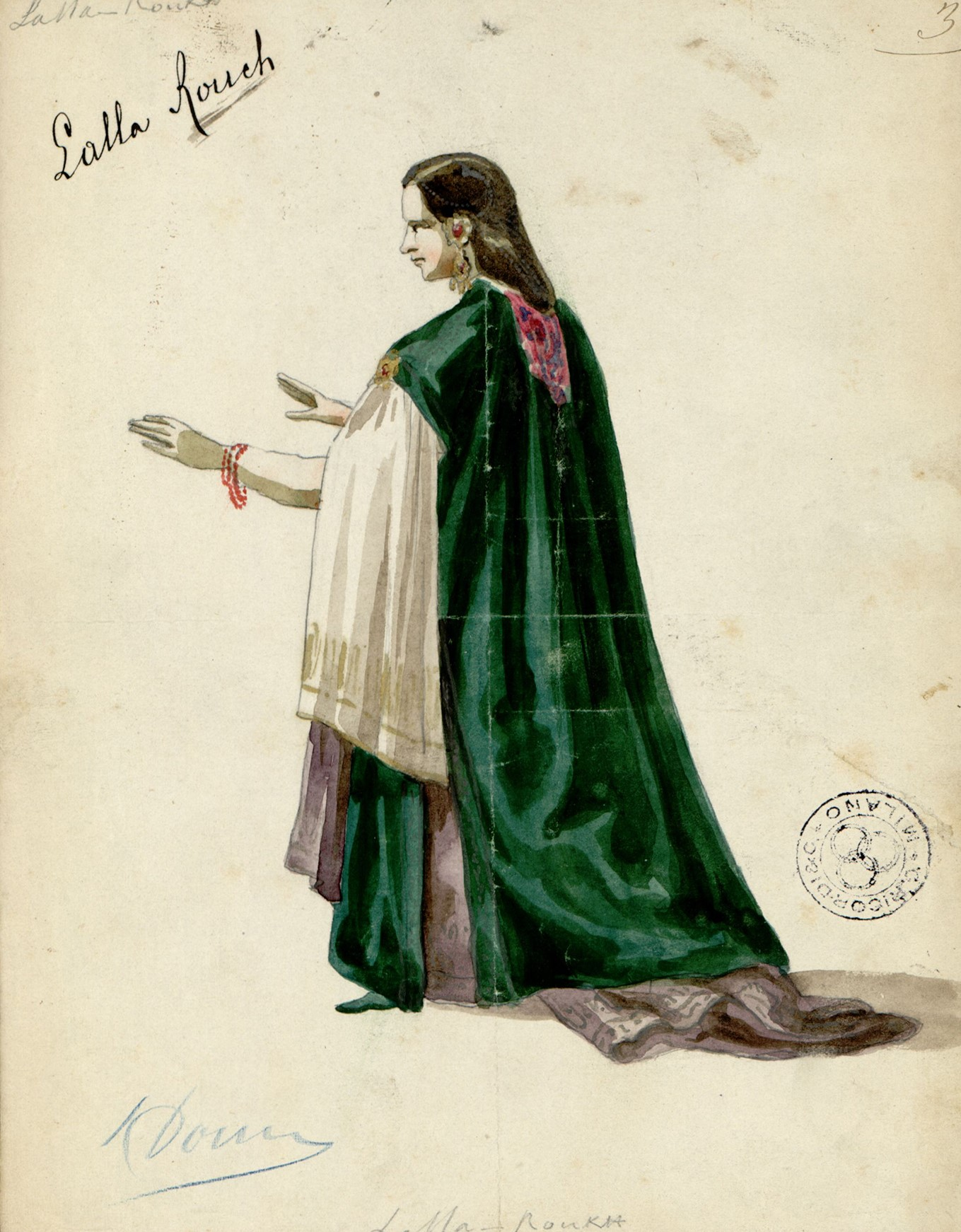
Lalla-Roukh (soprano), costume design for Lalla-Roukh (1870).

Roles, voice types, premiere cast
Role	Voice type	Premiere cast, 12 May 1862 (Note: Roles, voice types, and premiere cast from the Lalla Roukh score published by Girod 1862. Note that Casaglia 2005 lists Gourdin as a tenor.) Conductor: Édouard Deldevez
Lalla-Roukh, a Mughal princess	soprano	Marie Trotté-Cico
Mirza, Lalla-Roukh's confidante	soprano	Emma Bélia
Nourreddin, King of Samarkand, disguised as a poet-singer	tenor	Achille-Félix Montaubry
Baskir, a court eunuch and Lalla-Roukh's confidant	baritone	Alexandre Gourdin
Bacbara, a slave	bass	Davoust
Kaboul, a slave	bass	Lejeune

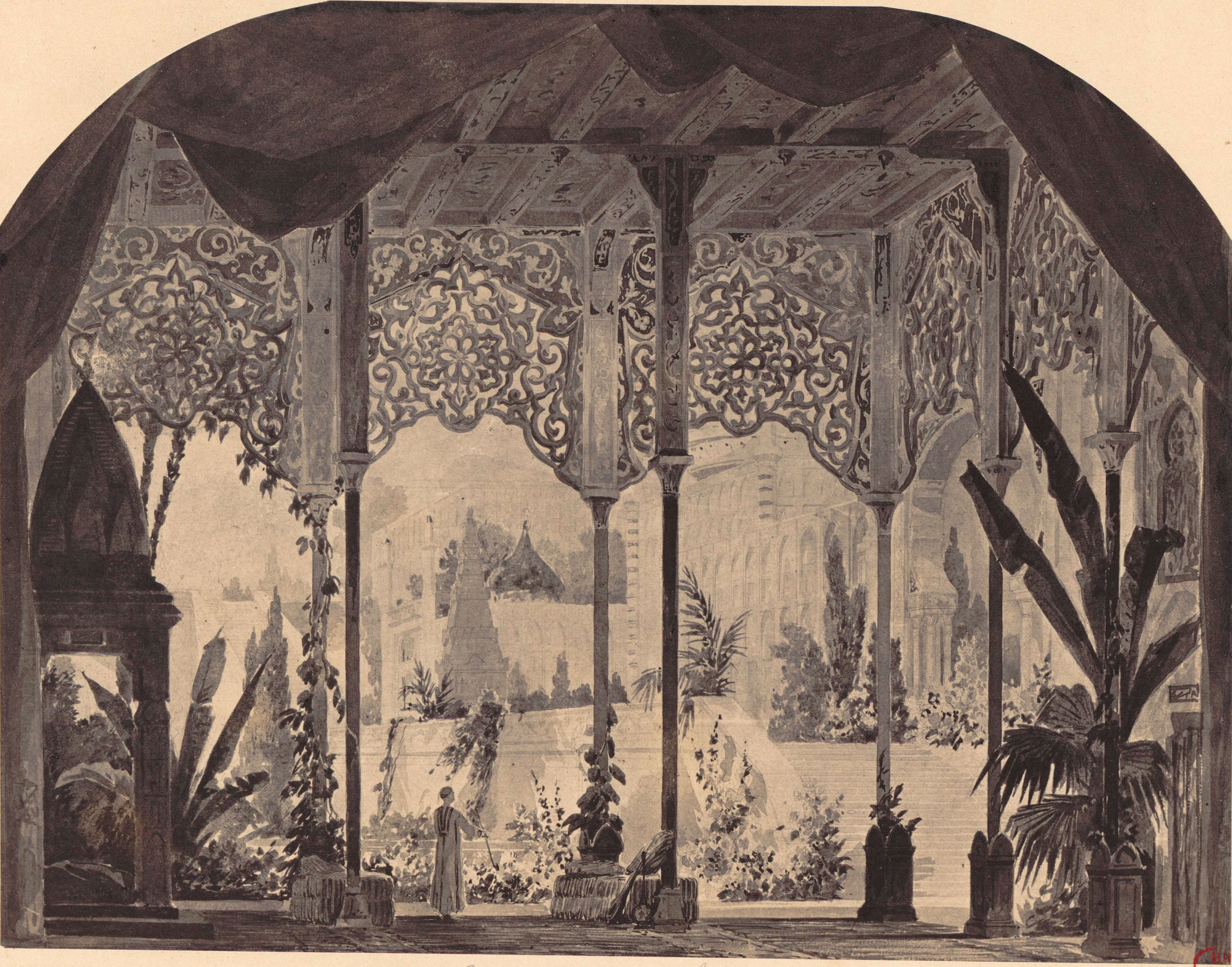
Set design for act 2 of Lalla-Roukh

== Synopsis ==
Lalla-Roukh, the daughter of the Mughal emperor Aurangzeb, has been promised in marriage to the King of Samarkand. Accompanied by her confidants, Mirza and a eunuch called Baskir, she departs in a caravan to the King's summer palace for the wedding. As the caravan travels through Kashmir, she is charmed by the nightly songs of Nourreddin, a mysterious poet-singer who has joined the caravan. The couple meet at night and pledge their love to each other. Lalla-Roukh tells him that when they arrive at the palace, she will confess all to the King and refuse to marry him, preferring to live in a simple cottage in Kashmir with her true love. When the caravan finally arrives at the palace, a crash of cymbals is heard and the King comes out to receive his bride. To her amazement, Lalla-Roukh realizes that he is in fact Nourreddin. (Note: Synopsis based on the description in Berlioz 1862, p. 2 with additions from Letellier 2010, pp. 270–271.)

== Recordings ==
In March 2014 Naxos Records released a complete recording of Opera Lafayette's revival of Lalla-Roukh, featuring Marianne Fiset as Lalla-Roukh, Emiliano Gonzalez Toro as Nourreddin, Nathalie Paulin as Mirza, and Bernard Deletré as Baskir. Earlier recordings include several extracts sung by the French soprano Solange Renaux for the Bibliothèque nationale de France. One of these, Mirza's couplets "Si vous ne savez plus charmer", also appears on the EMI boxed set Les Introuvables du Chant Français. Nourreddin's aria "O ma maîtresse" has been recorded by several French tenors.
