= Cigarrales de Toledo =

1624 work by Tirso de Molina

Cigarrales de Toledo (English:Weekend Retreats of Toledo) is a 1624 work by Tirso de Molina. The book is a collection of verse, stories, drama, and criticism arranged in the aesthetically pleasing Italian style of the time. The encircling premise of the book is that all its contents can be used for recreation and merriment on summer holidays. A group of friends ostensibly gather in a "cigarrale," or Tagus summer cottage, and spin the tales and verses for their entertainment. The three comedies contained amidst the other inclusions are: "The Shameful Man in the Palace," "How Friends Must Be," and "The Jealous Prudent."
