= Juan Ruiz de Alarcón =

16th-century Spanish writer (died 1639)

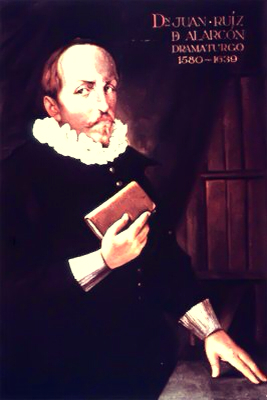
- Born: Juan Ruiz de Alarcón y Mendoza c. 1580; Taxco, Viceroyalty of New Spain (now Guerrero, Mexico)
- Died: 4 August 1639 (aged 58–59); Madrid, Spain
- Occupation: Writer

Signature
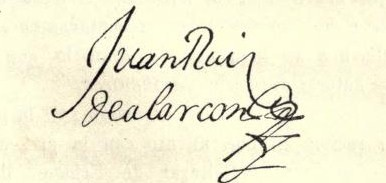

Juan Ruiz de Alarcón (c. 1581 – 4 August 1639) was a New Spanish writer of the Golden Age who cultivated different variants of dramaturgy. His works include the comedy La verdad sospechosa (es), which is considered a masterpiece of Latin American Baroque theater.

== Family ==
Juan Ruiz de Alarcón was born in Real de Taxco, later named Taxco de Alarcón in his honour. His family was of old Asturian nobility. The name Alarcón had been given to his ancestor Ferren Martínez de Ceballos by Alfonso VIII of Castile after he had successfully driven the Moors from the fortress of Alarcón near Cuenca in 1177. Juán Ruiz de Alarcón's maternal grandparents Hernando and María de Mendoza were among the first Spaniards to arrive in Mexico in 1535, when they established themselves in Taxco. Their daughter Leonor de Mendoza married Pedro Ruiz de Alarcón who was described as an hidalgo.

Juan Ruiz de Alarcón had four brothers: Pedro Ruiz de Alarcón, who was rector at the College of Saint John Lateran, Hernando Ruiz de Alarcón who was a priest and is known for having written a treatise documenting the non-Christian religious practices of the Nahua Indians of central Mexico, Gaspar and García, about whom little is known.

== Life ==
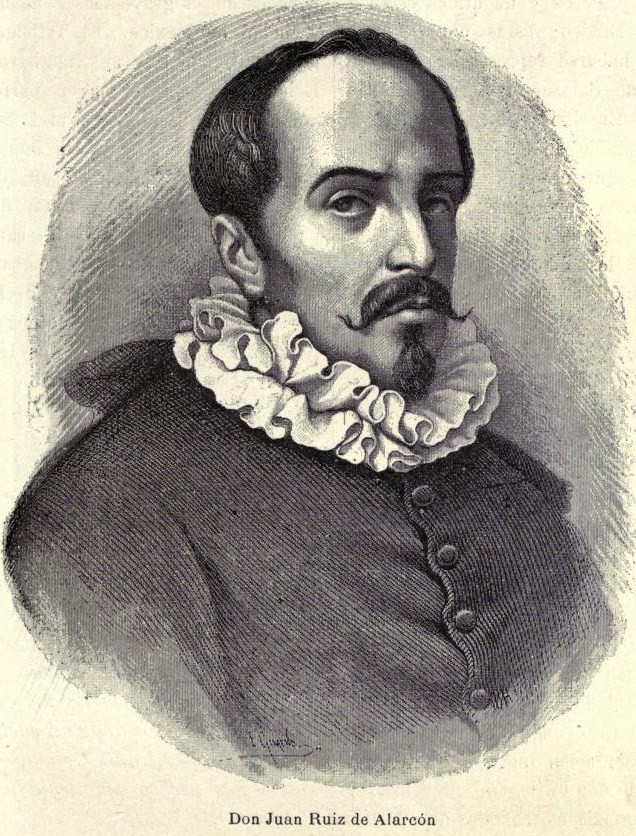
Grabado de Juan Ruiz de Alarcón, by Eduardo Gimeno.

Juan Ruiz de Alarcón was born about 1581 at Real de Taxco, New Spain, where his father was superintendent of mines; his mother was descended from one of Spain's most illustrious families, the Mendozas. He was small of stature and suffered from hunchbackedness. Besides, his red haired complexion made him an occasional object of scorn, since some sectors of the conservative catholic society in which he later lived held the prejudice that Judas Iscariot was a redhead. Because of this, his critics often ridiculed his appearance rather than his works.

He went to Spain in 1600, where he studied law at the University of Salamanca. He continued his studies towards a Licentiate in Law—roughly equivalent to a modern master's degree—which he finished in 1605, without, however, taking the degree. Instead, he practiced law for a while in Seville, then in 1608 went back to Mexico, and in 1609 received the licentiate from the University of Mexico. He completed his studies for his doctorate fairly soon thereafter, but never received the degree, in all likelihood because of the rather substantial costs attached to the ceremony. He worked as a legal adviser for a while, as an advocate, and as an interim investigating judge, all the while trying repeatedly and unsuccessfully to gain a teaching chair at the university.

Returning to Spain about 1611, he entered the household of the marquis de Salinas, and began a frustrating life of job-seeking at court. At the same time, purely as a way of making money apparently, he threw himself into the heady literary and theatrical life of the capital, eventually having a number of his plays performed. His first play, El semejante de sí mismo was unsuccessful, yet it attracted attention to him. By some, he was ridiculed and criticized; from others he obtained support.

For ten years, he pursued this double life, until he finally secured first an interim and then a permanent appointment to the Royal Council of the Indies (1626) — rather like an appeals court for Spanish colonies in America. Apparently, when political success came, he all but stopped his literary efforts—although he did have two volumes of his plays published (in 1628 and 1634), perhaps because some of them had been pirated and previously published with false attributions to his theatrical rival Félix Lope de Vega. After thirteen years of legal service to the crown, he died at Madrid in 1639.

== Literary career and importance ==
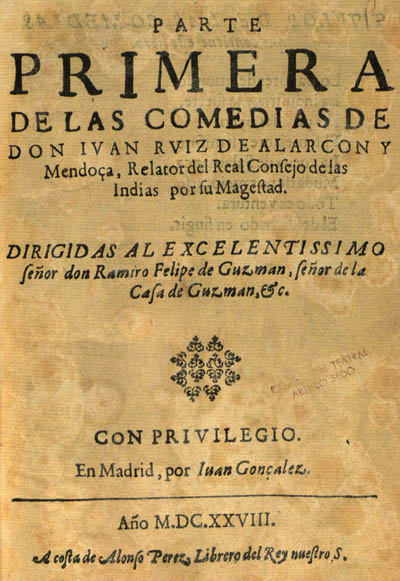
First Part of the Comedies of Don Juan Ruiz de Alarcón, 1628

Alarcón was the least prolific of all the great dramatists of Spain and is one of the very few Spanish-Americans among the great dramatists of the Siglo de Oro. He wrote less than did others, and many of his works circulated under their names. He took pains to mull over his plays and polish both their versification and their general composition. Fitzmaurice-Kelly said of Alarcón: "There are Spanish dramatists greater than Ruiz de Alarcón: there is none whose work is of such even excellence."

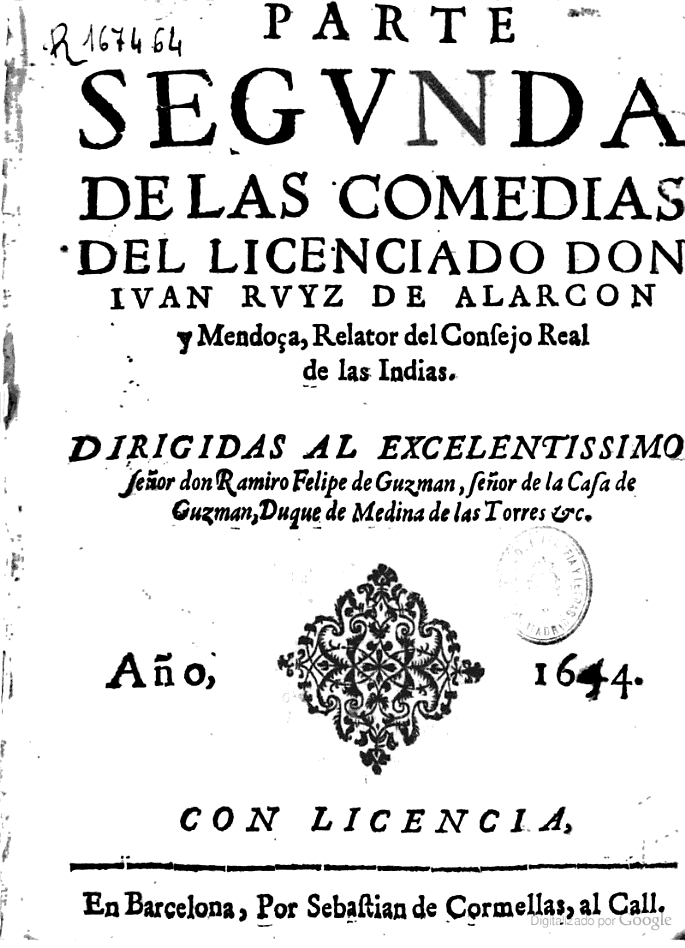
Second part of the comedies of the graduate by Iuan Rvyz de Alarcón y Mendoza, Rapporteur of the Council of the Indies (Barcelona, 1634).

He is the author of approximately twenty-five plays. Twenty of them were published by the playwright in two volumes. The first, from 1628, contains eight plays (Los favores del mundo, La industria y la suerte, Las paredes oyen, El semejante a sí mismo, La cueva de Salamanca, Mudarse por mejorarse, Todo es ventura and El desdichado en fingir); and the second volume from 1634 consists of twelve plays (Los empeños de un engaño, El dueño de las estrellas, La amistad castigada, La manganilla de Melilla, Ganar amigos, La verdad sospechosa, El anticristo, El tejedor de Segovia, La prueba de las promesas, Los pechos privilegiados, La crueldad por el honor and El examen de maridos). Other plays were published in collections. These include: Quien mal anda mal acaba, No hay mal que por bien no venga and La culpa busca la pena, y el agravio la venganza. He is also the author of a play written in collaboration, Algunas hazañas de las muchas de don García Hurtado de Mendoza (1622).

The most famous of his plays is La verdad sospechosa, (published in 1634). The first great French comedy in modern French literature, Corneille's Le menteur (The Liar), was confessedly modeled after it. Las paredes oyen (Walls have Ears) is often seen as a companion-piece since both plays deal with mendacity. His plays can be divided into at least three distinct categories: social comedies, political dramas and plays that dramatize astrology, magic and other occult practices. Among the political plays, El dueño de las estrellas stands out as a stunning tragedy, dealing with Lycurgus, the Spartan lawgiver. Although the oracle had predicted that he would either kill a king or be killed by one, when faced with the dilemma he commits suicide thus overcoming the power of the stars. A second political play, La amistad castigada, is unusual because the king is deposed at the end. The magic plays include astonishing instances of the occult at a time when such practices were frowned upon. See, for example, La cueva de Salamanca and La prueba de las promesas. Quien mal anda, mal acaba may be the first Spanish play that dramatizes a pact with the devil. Indeed, even in social comedies such as Las paredes oyen we can encounter extensive astrological allusions.

Embittered by his deformity, Alarcón was constantly engaged in personal quarrels with his rivals; but his attitude in these polemics is always dignified, and his crushing retort to Lope de Vega in Los pechos privilegiados is an unsurpassed example of cold, scornful invective.

More than any other Spanish dramatist, Alarcón was preoccupied with ethical aims, and his gift of dramatic presentation is as brilliant as his dialogue is natural and vivacious. It has been alleged that his non-Spanish origin is noticeable in his plays, and there is some foundation for the observation; but his workmanship is exceptionally conscientious, and in El Tejedor de Segovia he produced a masterpiece of national art, national sentiment and national expression.

== Works ==
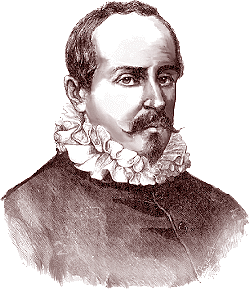
Portrait of the playwright Juan Ruiz de Alarcón y Mendoza (1581-1639)

=== Dramas in verse ===
- La verdad sospechosa (Suspect Truth)
- Los favores del mundo
- La industria y la suerte
- Las paredes oyen (The Walls Have Ears)
- El semejante a sí mismo (He Who is Similar to Himself)
- La cueva de Salamanca (The Cave in Salamanca)
- Mudarse por mejorarse
- Todo es ventura
- El desdichado en fingir
- Los empeños de un engaño
- El dueño de las estrellas (The Master of the Stars)
- La amistad castigada (Friendship Punished)
- La manganilla de Melilla (The Stratagem at Melilla)
- Ganar amigos
- El anticristo (The Antichrist)
- El tejedor de Segovia (The Weaver from Segovia)
- La prueba de las promesas (Trial through Promises)
- Los pechos privilegiados
- La crueldad por el honor
- El examen de maridos (The Test of Suitors)
- Quien mal anda en mal acaba (He Who Follows an Evil Way Ends Evilly)
- No hay mal que por bien no venga
- La Monja Alférez (The Nun Lieutenant), based on Catalina de Erauso

=== Non-dramatic texts in verse ===
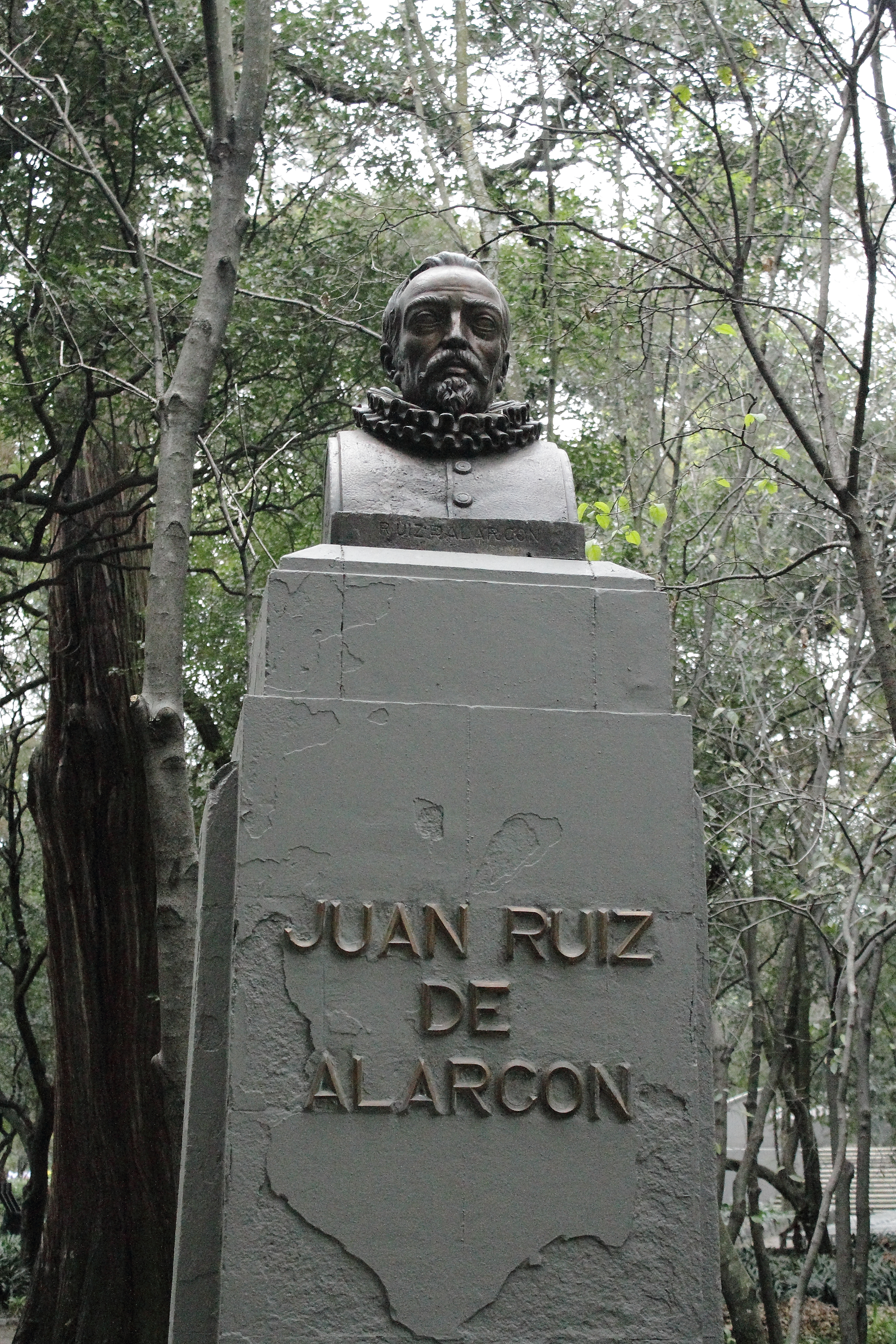
Monument to Juan Ruiz Mexico City.

- Una redondilla y cuatro décimas sobre el asunto que luego se verá
- Vejamen académico a Bricián Díez Cruzate, cuando se doctoró en la Universidad de México (1609-1613)
- Décima del licenciado don Juan Ruiz de Alarcón, natural de México
- Romance contra don Francisco de Quevedo
- El licenciado don Juan Ruiz de Alarcón y Mendoza a don Diego Agreda y Vargas
- Al doctor Cristóbal Pérez de Herrera, el licenciado don Juan Ruiz de Alarcón y Mendoza
- A don Gonzalo de Céspedes y Meneses, el licenciado don Juan Ruiz de Alarcón y Mendoza
- Al Santo Cristo que se halló en Prete, ciudad del Palatinado inferior, quitado de la Cruz y hecho pedazos por los calvinistas, restaurado por los católicos, el licenciado Juan Ruiz de Alarcón dirige estos sonetos
- De don Juan Ruiz de Alarcón en la muerte del Conde de Villamedina (21 de agosto de 1622)
- Elogio descriptivo a las fiestas que Su Majestad del rey Filipo IIII hizo por su persona en Madrid, a 21 de agosto de 1623 años, a la celebración de los conciertos entr el serenísimo Carlos Estuardo, Príncipe de Inglaterra, y la serenísima María de Austria, Infanta de Castilla, al Duque Adelantado & c.
- El licenciado don Juan Ruiz de Alarcón y Mendoza, al mismo (José Camerino)
- Al volcán en incendios del Vesubio, el licenciado don Juan Ruiz de Alarcón y Mendoza, Relator del Consejo de Indias. Epigrama XXIX
- Sonero dedicado al mismo asunto que el anterior
- Sátira contra don Francisco de Quevedo
- El licenciado don Juan Ruiz de Alarcón y Mendoza, Relator del Consejo de las Indias. Al autor. Décimas
