= The Trickster of Seville and the Stone Guest =

Play written by Tirso de Molina around 1616–30

The Seducer of Seville and the Stone Guest
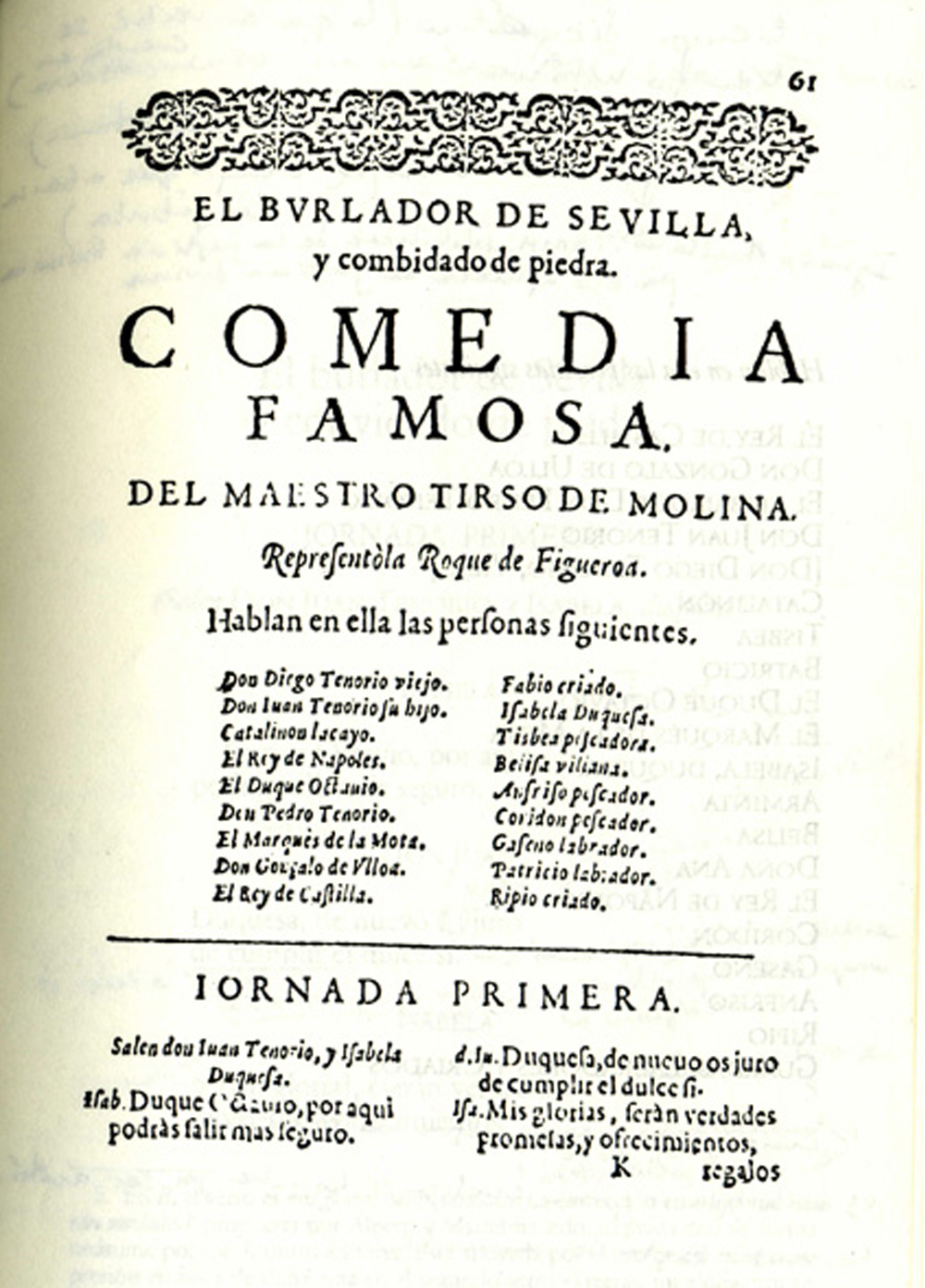
- Title page of an early printed edition
- Original language: Spanish
- Written by: Andrés de Claramonte or Tirso de Molina
- Subject: Don Juan
- Genre: Spanish Golden Age
- Setting: 14th century

Premiere
- Date: c. 1616–30

The Trickster of Seville and the Stone Guest (Spanish: El burlador de Sevilla y convidado de piedra) is a play traditionally attributed to Tirso de Molina, although several scholars now attribute it to Andrés de Claramonte. Its title varies according to the English translation, and it has also been published under the titles The Seducer of Seville and the Stone Guest and The Playboy of Seville and the Stone Guest. The play was first published in Spain around 1630, though it may have been performed as early as 1616. Set in the 14th century, the play is the earliest fully developed dramatisation of the Don Juan legend.

== Main characters ==
- Don Juan – protagonist (a young noble); relentlessly seduces all women possible by promising them marriage
- Duchess Isabela – Duchess that Don Juan tricks; she was going to marry Duke Octavio
- Don Gonzalo – nobleman and military commander, Doña Ana's father
- Doña Ana – noble woman and Don Gonzalo's daughter; is engaged to Don Juan for a time (but the engagement is broken off)

== Secondary characters ==
- Octavio – Duke, Isabela's lover
- Don Pedro – Don Juan's sympathetic uncle
- Tisbea – peasant girl seduced by Don Juan
- Catalinón – Don Juan's servant
- Don Diego – Don Juan's father
- Marqués de la Mota – another womanizer, who is in love with Doña Ana
- Aminta – another peasant girl seduced by Don Juan
- Batricio – peasant man who is newly married to Aminta
- Fabio – Isabela's servant

== Summary ==
=== Act One ===
The play begins in Naples with Don Juan and the Duchess Isabela who, alone in her palace room, have just enjoyed a night of love together. However, when Isabela wants to light a lamp, she realizes that he is not her lover, the Duke Octavio, and screams for help. Don Juan's uncle, Don Pedro, comes to arrest the offender. But Don Juan cleverly reveals his identity as his nephew and Don Pedro assists him in making his escape just in time. Pedro then claims to the King that the unknown man was Duke Octavio. The King orders Octavio and Isabela to be married at once, with both of them to be held in prison until the wedding.

At home, after Octavio speaks of his love for Isabela, Don Pedro comes to arrest him, claiming that Octavio had violated Isabela the previous night. Octavio, of course, had done no such thing, and starts to believe that Isabela has been unfaithful to him. He flees from Don Pedro, planning to leave the country.

By the seashore of Tarragona, a peasant girl named Tisbea happens to find Don Juan and his servant, Catalinón, apparently washed up from a shipwreck. She tries to revive Don Juan, who wakes and immediately declares his love for her. Tisbea takes Juan back to her house, intending to nurse him back to health and mend his clothes.

Back in Seville, the King speaks to Don Gonzalo, a nobleman and military commander, about arranging a marriage between Don Juan and Gonzalo's daughter, Doña Ana. Gonzalo likes the idea and goes to discuss it with his daughter.

Back at the seashore, Don Juan and Catalinón flee, apparently after Don Juan has already seduced Tisbea. Catalinón scolds him, but Don Juan reminds him that this is not his first seduction, and jokes that he has a medical condition in which he must seduce. Catalinón says that he is a plague for women. Tisbea catches up with the two men, and Don Juan assures her that he intends to marry her. Tisbea is so overcome with grief and anger over what happened that she exclaims "fuego, fuego" (meaning that she is burning up with hate and a desire for revenge). She is also overcome with shame at the undoing of her honor and flings herself into the ocean.

=== Act Two ===
In Seville, Don Diego, Don Juan's father, tells the king that the man who seduced the Duchess Isabela was not Octavio, but Don Juan, and shows a letter from Don Pedro as proof. The King declares Don Juan banished from Seville and retracts his plans to have him marry Doña Ana. Just then, Octavio arrives, begging the king's forgiveness for having fled earlier. The King grants it, and allows him to stay as a guest in the palace.

Next, Don Juan and Catalinón arrive and talk to the Marquis de la Mota, who is a womanizer nearly as bad as Don Juan. The Marquis confesses, however, that he is actually in love with his cousin Doña Ana, but laments that she is arranged to marry someone else. Mota says he is going to visit Ana, and Don Juan sends Catalinón to follow him in secret. Don Juan's plans are also helped along when a servant of Ana's, having just seen Don Juan talking to Mota, asks that he give to Mota a letter from Ana. In the letter, Ana asks Mota to visit her during the night, at 11 o'clock sharp, since it will be their one and only chance to ever be together. Mota comes back again, apparently not having found Ana at home, and Don Juan says he received instructions from Ana that Mota should come to the house at midnight. Mota lends Don Juan his cape at the end of the scene.

That night at Don Gonzalo's home, Ana is heard screaming that someone has dishonored her, and her father, Don Gonzalo, rushes to her aid with his sword drawn. Don Juan draws his own sword and kills Don Gonzalo. With his final breath, Don Gonzalo swears to haunt Don Juan. Don Juan leaves the house just in time to find Mota and give him his cape back and flees. Mota is immediately seen wearing the same cloak as the man who murdered Don Gonzalo and is arrested.

The next day, near Dos Hermanas, Don Juan happens upon a peasant wedding and takes a particular interest in the bride, Aminta. The groom, Batricio, is perturbed by the presence of a nobleman at his wedding but is powerless to do anything.

=== Act Three ===
Don Juan pretends to have known Aminta long ago and deflowered her already, and by law she must now marry him. He goes to enjoy Aminta for the first time and convinces her that he means to marry her at once. The two of them go off together to consummate the union, with Juan having convinced Aminta that it is the surest way to nullify her last marriage.

Elsewhere Isabela and her servant, Fabio, are travelling, looking for Don Juan, whom she has now been instructed to marry. She complains of this arrangement and declares that she still loves Octavio. While travelling, they happen upon Tisbea, who survived a suicide attempt. When Isabela asks Tisbea why she is so sad, Tisbea tells the story of how Don Juan seduced her. Isabela then asks Tisbea to accompany her.

Don Juan and Catalinón are back in Seville, passing by a churchyard. They see the tomb of Don Gonzalo, and Don Juan jokingly invites the statue on the tomb to have dinner with him and laughs about how the hauntings and promised vengeance have not yet come.

That same night, as Don Juan sits down for dinner at his home, his servants become frightened and run away. Don Juan sends Catalinón to investigate, and he returns, horrified, followed by the ghost of Gonzalo in the form of the statue on his tomb. Don Juan is initially frightened but quickly regains control of himself and calmly sits to dine while his servants cower around him. Gonzalo invites Juan to dine again in the churchyard with him, and he promises to come.

At the Alcázar, the King and Don Diego, Don Juan's father, discuss the impending marriage to Isabela, as well as the newly arranged marriage between Mota and Doña Ana. Octavio then arrives and asks the King for permission to duel with Don Juan, and tells the truth of what has happened to Isabela to Diego, who was until now unaware of this particular misdeed of his son. The King and Diego leave, and Aminta appears, looking for Don Juan since she thinks he is now her husband. Octavio takes her to the king so that she can tell him her story.

In the churchyard, Don Juan tells Catalinón about how lovely Isabela looks and how they are to be married in a few hours. The ghost of Gonzalo appears again, and he sets out a table on the cover of a tomb. He serves a meal of vipers and scorpions, which Juan bravely eats. At the end of the meal, Gonzalo grabs Don Juan by the wrist, striking him dead. In a clap of thunder, the ghost, the tomb, and Don Juan disappear, leaving only Catalinón, who runs away in terror.

At the Alcázar, every single character who has been wronged by Don Juan is complaining to the King, when Catalinón enters and announces the strange story of Don Juan's death. All the women who have claim to Don Juan as their husband are declared widows, and Catalinón admits that Ana escaped from Don Juan before he could dishonor her. Mota plans to marry Ana, Octavio chooses to marry Isabela, Tisbea is free to marry again if she chooses, and Batricio and Aminta go back home.

== Adaptations ==
The play was adapted into Italian in Florence in 1657.

== Sources ==
- Banham, Martin, ed. 1998. The Cambridge Guide to Theatre. Cambridge: Cambridge UP. ISBN 0-521-43437-8.
- Bentley, Eric, ed. 1984. The Trickster of Seville. By Tirso de Molina. Trans. Roy Campbell. In Life is a Dream and Other Spanish Classics. Eric Bentley's Dramatic Repertoire v.2. New York: Applause. 137–218. ISBN 978-1-55783-006-7.
- Brockett, Oscar G. and Franklin J. Hildy. 2003. History of the Theatre. Ninth edition, International edition. Boston: Allyn and Bacon. ISBN 0-205-41050-2.
- Bunn, Elaine. 1998. "Tirso de Molina." In Banham (1998, 1112–1113).
- Edwards, Gwynne, trans. 1986. The Trickster of Seville and the Stone Guest. By Tirso de Molina. Hispanic Classics ser. Warminster: Aris & Phillips. ISBN 0-85668-301-9.
