= Frederick A. de Armas =

Cuban writer (born 1945)

Frederick A. de Armas (born 1945) is a literary scholar, critic and novelist who has been Robert O. Anderson Distinguished Service Professor in Romance Languages and Comparative Literature at the University of Chicago and is now Professor emeritus.

== Biography ==
Frederick A. de Armas was born in Havana, Cuba on February 9, 1945. He attended elementary school at La Salle and when his parents moved to France, he went to boarding school at Le Rosey in Switzerland.

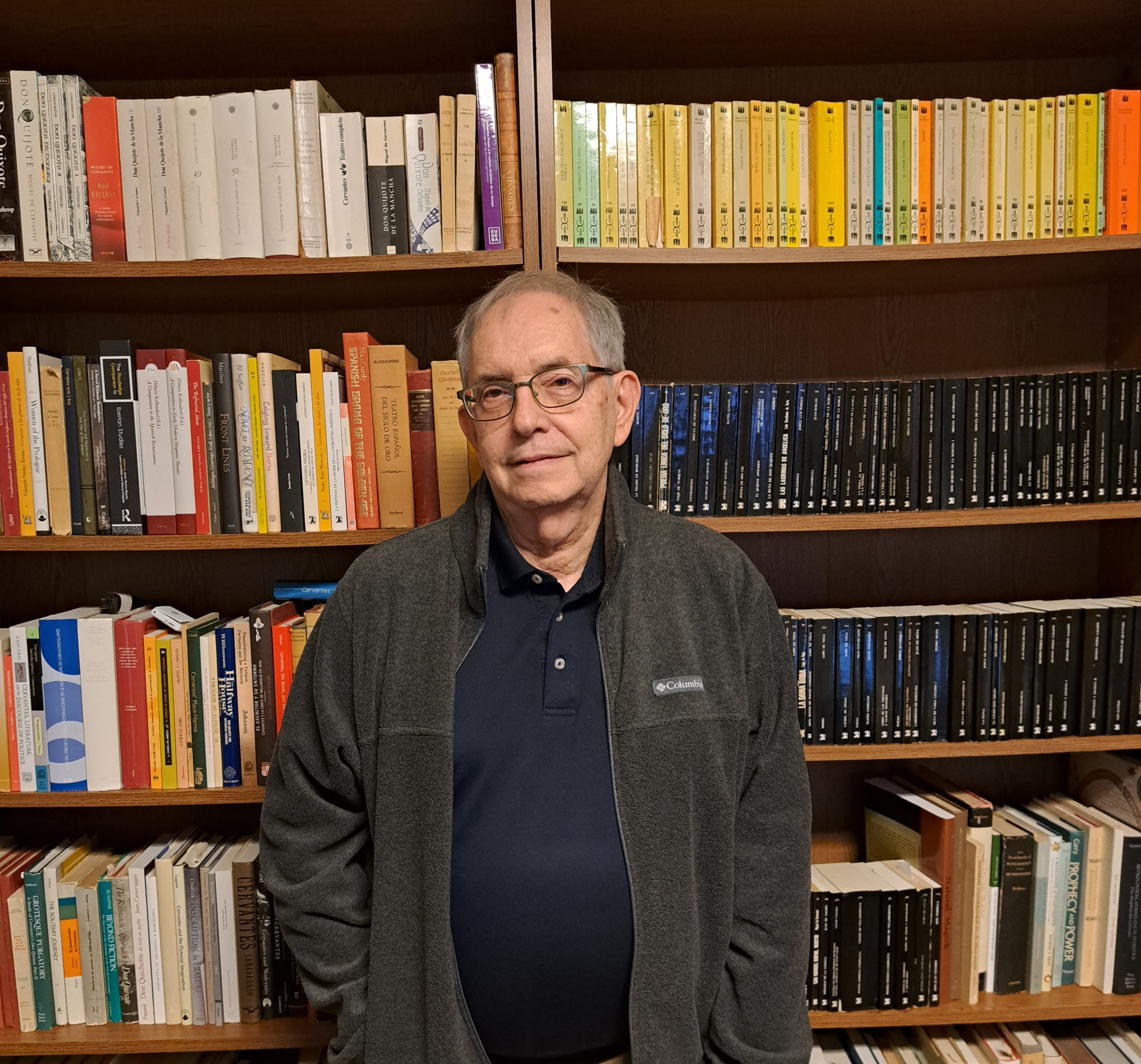
Frederick A. de Armas in November 2023

After his family lost their possessions as a result of the Cuban Revolution, he moved to the United States. De Armas holds a Ph.D. in Comparative Literature from the University of North Carolina at Chapel Hill (1969), and has taught at Louisiana State University (1969–1988), Pennsylvania State University (where he was Edwin Erle Sparks Professor of Spanish and Comparative Literature) (1988–2000) and has been a visiting professor at Duke University (1994).

Since 2000 he has been at the University of Chicago where he was Andrew W. Mellon Distinguished Service Professor in the Departments of Romance Languages and Literatures and Comparative Literature. In the fall of 2021 he was given the title of Robert O. Anderson Distinguished Service Professor, becoming professor emeritus in August, 2024. He has served as Chair of Romance Languages and Literatures (2006–2009; 2010–2012). In addition he has been vice president and President of the Cervantes Society of America (2003–2009); and President of AISO Asociacion Internacional Siglo de Oro (2015-2017). In 2018 he received a doctorate honoris causa from the University of Neuchatel. In 2023 he received the Norman Maclean Faculty Award for his teaching and service to the University for over twenty years.

== Career ==
De Armas' publications focus on early modern Spanish literature and culture, often from a comparative perspective. His interests include the politics of astrology, magic and the Hermetic tradition, ekphrasis, verbal and visual culture, etc. His early books evince an interest in the relationship between mythology and literature, between the classics and Spanish Golden Age works. They include: The Invisible Mistress: Aspects of Feminism and Fantasy in the Golden Age (1976), which contains some of the earliest discussions of proto-feminism in early modern Spain, and The Return of Astraea: An Astral-Imperial Myth in Calderón (1986), which is one of the first studies that approach Calderón from a historicist perspective and is also deeply influenced by the writings of the Warburg Institute. For example, he interprets the figure of Circe in one of Calderon's plays as critiquing the policies of Philip IV's minister, the Count-Duke of Olivares. On the other hand, Astraea is in many cases a figure that serves to praise the regime. His interest in Golden Age Theater has led him to publish several book collections: The Prince in the Tower: Perceptions of "La vida es sueño" (1993), Heavenly Bodies: The Realms of "La estrella de Sevilla" (1996) and A Star-Crossed Golden Age: Myth and the Spanish Comedia (1998).

One of his main interests throughout his career has been the relationship between the verbal and the visual in early modern Spanish literature and Italian art. In recent years, this subject has become central to his research, as evinced by the book, Cervantes, Raphael and the Classics (Cambridge, 1998). This study focuses on Cervantes' most famous tragedy, La Numancia, showing how it is engaged in a conversation with classical authors of Greece and Rome, especially through the interpretations of antiquity presented by the artist Raphael. This book was followed by the collections Writing for the Eyes in the Spanish Golden Age (2004) and Ekphrasis in the Age of Cervantes (2005). In the introduction to this last collection he establishes a typology of ekphrasis, including definitions for allusive, collectionist, descriptive, dramatic, interpolated, narrative, shaping, and veiled ekphrasis, as well as meta-ekphrasis and ur-ekphrasis. He applies these terms in his book: Quixotic Frescoes. Cervantes and Italian Art (Toronto, 2006).

After his book on Cervantes and Italian art, he co-edited two collections on Spanish Golden Age theater. The first one, on tragedy, is entitled Hacia la tragedia: Lecturas para un nuevo milenio (Madrid, 2008); and the second one, on a specific writer is called Calderón: del manuscrito a la escena (2011). At the same time, he continues to work on Cervantes, having published an edited volume, Ovid in the Age of Cervantes (2010). His Don Quixote among the Saracens: Clashes of Civilizations and Literary Genres (2011) has received the American Publishers' Association PROSE Award in Literature, Honorable Mention (2011). The book has a double focus. The first has to do with a clash of civilizations and asks: Why is Don Quixote at peace among the Saracens? The second has to do with Don Quixote as an "imperial" vehicle for the assimilation or destruction of literary genres.

He co-edited Women Warriors in Early Modern Spain (2019), an essay collection dedicated to the scholarly work of Bárbara Mujica, a volume that attests to his continuing interest in issues of proto-feminism in the Iberian Peninsula. A brief excursus into the relations between China and Spain followed, Faraway Settings: Chinese and Spanish theaters of the 16th and 17th Centuries (2019). Shortly after penning a co-edited collection, The Gastronomical Arts in Spain: Food and Etiquette (2022), he published a book prompted by the COVID-19 pandemic,Cervantes' Architectures The Dangers Outside (2022). The volume takes as a point of departure Yi-Fu Tuan's ideas of space as freedom and danger versus place as safety, and how this opposition plays out in Cervantes' fiction.

Starting around 2008 De Armas became increasingly interested in the cultural and literary productions of the maternal side of his family, publishing essays on Ana Galdós, Domingo A. Galdós and Benito Pérez Galdós. He has also started to publish fiction while continuing to work on the literature and culture of early modern Spain. His novel, El abra del Yumuri, takes place in Cuba during the last three months of 1958, just before the fall of Fulgencio Batista and the triumph of the Cuban Revolution. It focuses on the lives of five women, most of them from the upper bourgeoisie, and how they deal with political and social upheaval, as well as the dangers of a serial killer that preys on women of means. For some critics, the novel combines two very different trends: that of the social novel inspired by Benito Pérez Galdós, and that of magic realism embodied by Alejo Carpentier. The novel has been translated into Portuguese in 2026 and includes extensive footnotes. His second novel Sinfonía Salvaje, includes some of the same women that appeared in his first, but, set in the last half of 1959, these characters are now concerned with social and political changes due to the revolution. These changes are embodied in a transvestite and in the belief that some revolutionaries look like wolves, thus espousing the belief in the werewolf

Most recently, he has been involved in the study of the Sublime (philosophy) in Renaissance and early modern cultures, as well as in the uses of ancient art, particularly the work of Timanthes in Renaissance and early modern Spanish literature.

== Bibliography ==
- The Four Interpolated Stories in the Roman Comique (Chapel Hill: University of North Carolina Press, 1971).
- Paul Scarron (New York: Twayne Books, 1972).
- The Invisible Mistress: Aspects of Feminism and Fantasy in the Golden Age (Charlottesville: Biblioteca Siglo de Oro, 1976).ISBN 978-8439959588
- The Return of Astraea: An Astral-Imperial Myth in Calderón (Lexington: University Press of Kentucky, 1986).
- The Prince in the Tower: Perceptions of "La vida es sueño" (Lewisburg: Bucknell University Press, 1993). ISBN 978-0838752524
- Heavenly Bodies: The Realms of "La estrella de Sevilla" (Lewisburg: Bucknell University Press, 1996). ISBN 978-0838753088
- A Star-Crossed Golden Age: Myth and the Spanish Comedia (Lewisburg: Bucknell University Press, 1998). ISBN 978-0838753767
- Cervantes, Raphael and the Classics (Cambridge: Cambridge University Press, 1998). ISBN 978-0521593021
- European Literary Careers: The Author from Antiquity to the Renaissance (Toronto: University of Toronto Press, 2002). Edited with Patrick Cheney. ISBN 978-0802047793
- Writing for the Eyes in the Spanish Golden Age (Lewisburg: Bucknell University Press, 2004). ISBN 978-0838755716
- Ekphrasis in the Age of Cervantes (Lewisburg: Bucknell University Press, 2005). ISBN 978-1611482355
- Quixotic Frescoes: Cervantes and Italian Renaissance Art (Toronto: University of Toronto Press, 2006). ISBN 978-0802090744
- Hacia la tragedia: Lecturas para un nuevo milenio. Biblioteca Áurea Hispánica 55 (Madrid/Frankfurt: Iberoamericana /Vervuert, 2008). Edited with Luciano Garcia Lorenzo and Enrique Garcia Santo-Tomas. ISBN 978-8484894292
- Ovid in the Age of Cervantes (Toronto: University of Toronto Press, 2010). ISBN 978-1442641174
- Don Quixote among the Saracens: A Clash of Civilizations and Literary Genres (Toronto: University of Toronto Press, 2011).ISBN 978-1442616011
- Calderón: del manuscrito a la escena. Biblioteca Áurea Hispánica 75 (Madrid/Frankfurt: Iberoamericana/Vervuert, 2011). Edited with Luciano Garcia Lorenzo. ISBN 978-8484896340
- Objects of Culture in the Literature of Imperial Spain (Toronto: University of Toronto Press, 2013). Edited with Mary E. Barnard. ISBN 978-1442645127
- Nuevas sonoras aves. Catorce estudios sobre Calderon de la Barca (Madrid: Iberoamericana, 2015). Edited with Antonio Sánchez Jiménez ISBN 978-8484898726
- El retorno de Astrea: Astrología, mito e imperio en Calderón. Biblioteca Áurea Hispánica 108 (Madrid/Frankfurt: Iberoamericana/Vervuert, 2016). ISBN 978-8484899594
- La astrología en el teatro clásico europeo (Siglos XVI y XVII) (Madrid: Ediciones Antigona, 2017). ISBN 978-8416923298
- Autoridad y poder en el teatro del Siglo de Oro: estrategias y conflictos (New York: IDEA, 2017). Edited with Ignacio Arellano Ayuso. ISBN 978-1938795404
- Miguel de Cervantes, La fuerza de la sangre (Madrid: Ediciones 74, 2017). Edited by Frederick A de Armas ISBN 978-1545002025
- Memorias de un honrado aguador: Ámbitos de estudio en torno a la difusión de Lazarillo de Tormes. Prosa Barroca (Madrid: Sial, 2017). Edited with Julio Vélez Sainz. ISBN 978-8417043537
- Women Warriors in Early Modern Spain. A Tribute to Bárbara Mujica (Newark, Delaware: University of Delaware Press, 2019). Edited with Susan L. Fischer. ISBN 978-1644530160
- Faraway Settings: Chinese and Spanish theaters of the 16th and 17th Centuries (Madrid/Frankfurt: Iberoamericana/Vervuert, 2019). Edited with Juan Pablo Gil-Osle. ISBN 978-8491920922
- The Gastronomical Arts in Spain: Food and Etiquette (Toronto: University of Toronto Press, 2022). Edited with James Mandrell. ISBN 978-1487540524
- Cervantes' Architectures: The Dangers Outside (Toronto: University of Toronto Press, 2022). ISBN 978-1487542399
- Bodies Beyond Labels: Finding Joy in the Shadows of Imperial Spain (Toronto: University of Toronto Press, 2024). Edited with Daniel Holcombe. ISBN 978-1487556907
- The Spatial Turn in the Literature and Art of Early Modern Spain (Toronto: University of Toronto Press, 2026). Edited with Mary E. Barnard. ISBN 978-1-4875-6533-6

== Bibliography: fiction ==
- El abra del Yumurí (Madrid: Verbum, 2016) ISBN 9788490744024
- Doce cuentos ejemplares y otros documentos cervantinos. Instituto del Teatro de Madrid (Madrid: Ediciones Clásicas,2016). Edited with Antonio Sánchez Jiménez. ISBN 9788479235475
- Sinfonía Salvaje (Madrid: Verbum, 2019) ISBN 9788490748039
- A garganta do Yumurí. Translated into Portuguese and annotated by Andréa Cesco and Wagner Monteiro; preface by Miguel Ángel Zamorano (Rio de Janeiro, 7Letras, 2026) ISBN 9788542108828 https://7letras.com.br/livro/a-garganta-do-yumuri/

== See also ==
- List of University of Chicago people
