= La Fábula de Polifemo y Galatea =

Literary work by Luis de Góngora y Argote

La Fábula de Polifemo y Galatea (The Fable of Polyphemus and Galatea), or simply the Polifemo, is a literary work written by Spanish poet Luis de Góngora y Argote. The poem, though borrowing heavily from prior literary sources of Greek and Roman Antiquity, attempts to go beyond the established versions of the myth by reconfiguring the narrative structure handed down by Ovid. Through the incorporation of highly innovative poetic techniques, Góngora effectively advances the background story of Acis and Galatea’s infatuation as well as the jealousy of the Cyclops Polyphemus.

The Polifemo was completed in manuscript form in 1613 and was subsequently published in 1627 after Góngora’s death (see 1627 in poetry). The work is traditionally regarded as one of Góngora’s most lofty poetic endeavors and is arguably his finest artistic achievement along with the Soledades. The Polifemo, in sum, realizes the final stage of Góngora’s sophisticated poetic style, which slowly developed over the course of his career. In addition to the Soledades and other later works, the Polifemo demonstrates the fullest extent of Góngora’s highly accentuated, erudite and impressionistic poetic style known as culteranismo.

As made evident in the opening of the poem, the Polifemo was dedicated to the Count of Niebla, a Castilian nobleman renowned for his generous patronage of 17th century Spain’s most preeminent artists. The work’s predominant themes, jealousy and competition, reflect the actual competitive environment and worldly aspirations that drove 17th-century poets such as Góngora to cultivate and display their artistic ingenuity. Góngora wrote his Polifemo in honor of Luis Carillo y Sotomayor's Fabula de Acis y Galatea, which was a contemporary poem depicting the same mythological account. Additionally, the poem of Carillo y Sotomayor was in deed dedicated to the very same Count of Niebla. Luis Carrillo y Sotomayor was both Góngora’s friend and a fellow “culteranist” poet who died at the age of 27 in 1610, three years before Góngora's Polifemo was completed. The premature death of a promising pupil in a sense prompted the creation of the Polifemo.

== Conventional restraints; the Polifemo and poetic liberation in the Spanish Baroque ==
The Polifemo is unprecedented for Góngora in terms of its length, its florid style, and its ingenio (artistic ingenuity or innovation). Regarding its literary form, the poem develops in a manner that is distinctively unmindful of the mediating artistic clarity outlined in Aristotle’s Poetics

Contemporary critics such as Luis Carrillo y Sotomayor would come to see these Aristotelian precepts as artistically stifling. In his Libro de la Erudición Poética, Carillo formally denounces both clarity and straightforwardness, particularly when such artistic ideals placed parameters on poetic expression in an effort to make "oneself intelligible to the half-educated." Though culteranismo maintained this elitist and aristocratic quality well after Carillo's death, this seemingly haughty comment on the part of Góngora's pupil was actually a jibe at Góngora's fiercest critics whose periodic vitriol sought to discredit the artist and his work. This fundamental debate between artistic clarity, intelligibility, lyricism, novelty and free expression first outlined in the Poetics of Aristotle and debated in the literary circles of posterity would never cease to divide artists throughout the modern era. Culteranismo, which was particularly fond of playful obscurity, has consequently incurred the disdain of several critics for its liberal artistic outlooks, which critics lampooned as frivolous and pedantic.

The primacy of ingenio contradicted the claims of more traditional critics who sought to tame instinct by imposing a rigorous aesthetic framework of poetic regulations derived from the ancients in order to establish a more coherent dialogue with the audience or reader. Critics such as Juan Martínez de Jáuregui y Aguilar and Francisco de Quevedo, for reasons related to their obscure lyricism, saw culternanist poets as highly affected, superficial and purposefully obscure with the intention of masking poetic mediocrity with highly ornate phraseology.

Regardless of the charges levied against his style, Góngora would remain one of the most influential poets of the Spanish Baroque and would influence in turn the styles of even his most malicious critics. The sophisticated metaphors displayed in the Polifemo would later inspire French symbolists such as Paul Verlaine as well as modern Spanish poets such as Federico García Lorca and fellow members of the Generation of '27. Culteranismo has always retained a highly arcane and esoteric quality throughout the centuries which would eventually inform the mystical nostalgia definitive to the poetry of other 20th century modernist poets. Along with conceptismo, culteranismo largely defined Spanish Baroque Poetry. Culteranismo, as a 17th-century artistic movement, sought to elevate pure ingenio over the ideal of imitatio (Latin term for artistic imitation), a tendency that dominated Renaissance poetry (see ad fontes). The ambiguity of culternanists would continue to incur criticism from more conservative Spanish poets and thinkers for centuries.

== Plot summary and analysis ==
The Polifemo is composed of 63 stanzas, each of which are composed of 8 lines in total. In its entirety, the Polifemo comprises 504 lines. Throughout the poem there is an abundance of poetic correspondences (i.e. organic or interior referencing), which contrast sharply with the abstruse quality of the cultismos (i.e. highly idiosyncratic linguistic modifications, classical lexicon and scholarly references) themselves. Additionally, the ornamentality and detail of the work is further complicated by a profuse usage of classical symbolism and external referencing (i.e. relevant mythological accounts communicated through metaphors and anecdotes). A cultismo, though often intuited as an umbrella term for a particular display of culteranismo, can be thought of as a poetic device that abandons the precision of ordinary language for the sake of artistic expression. Within the poem, parallelism, proportionality, dissonance and intricate array of puns involving both similitude and antithesis also give the poem greater complexity than that of its classical predecessors.

=== Opening (dedication to the Patron of Niebla) – Stanzas 1–3 ===
The elaborate summoning of the Sicilian Muse Thalia celebrates antiquity and the pastoral genre. Furthermore, this introduction involving a Grecian muse emphasizes ingenio itself over that of a more rudimentary imitation delineated by regulations and set expectations. Imitatio (the reverential imitation of the art of the ancients) was prevalent in Renaissance poetry as seen in the verse of the highly influential Spanish poet Garcilaso de la Vega who in turn borrowed heavily from the Italian Dolce Stil Novo poets, such as Petrarch, who revolutionized the poetry of the 14th and 15th centuries.

=== The Cave and the World of Polifemo – Stanzas 4–12 ===
Contrary to the tranquil and idealized settings typical of the pastoral genre, Góngora maintains a fluctuating Background–Foreground dynamic throughout the Polifemo, which makes itself apparent at the very beginning of the poem. Given his fondness for convoluted and self-fashioned metaphors in addition to his profuse use of hiperbatón, the quality of the lyrical poetry defamiliarizes and reconfigures all aspects of the original narration (see ostranenie). The presence of contrasts, of antithesis and dissimilitude reflects a veritable lack of aesthetic concentration as well as deficient narrative unity deemed necessary in traditional Aristotelian aesthetics. Instead, Góngora juxtaposes conflicting images of beauty and ugliness, harmony and discord to hint at an underlying dichotomy of erotic love as both prolific and destructive.

The interspersing of the unsavory and the melancholic with the idyllic deviates from the Renaissance ideal, which differentiated forms by establishing boundaries, namely foregrounds and backgrounds where central objects or figures displaced the prominence of other things. Within the art of the Renaissance, there is a higher degree of hermetic focus, concentration and stability of form. “In contrast to the classical delineation of boundaries”, which gives precedence to forms with greater density and texture, the Baroque style sought to dissolve the divisions between the ‘intended figure’ and ‘unintended background’ or apeirion “in favor of a vision characterized by ‘a mysterious interflow of form and light and colour.’”.

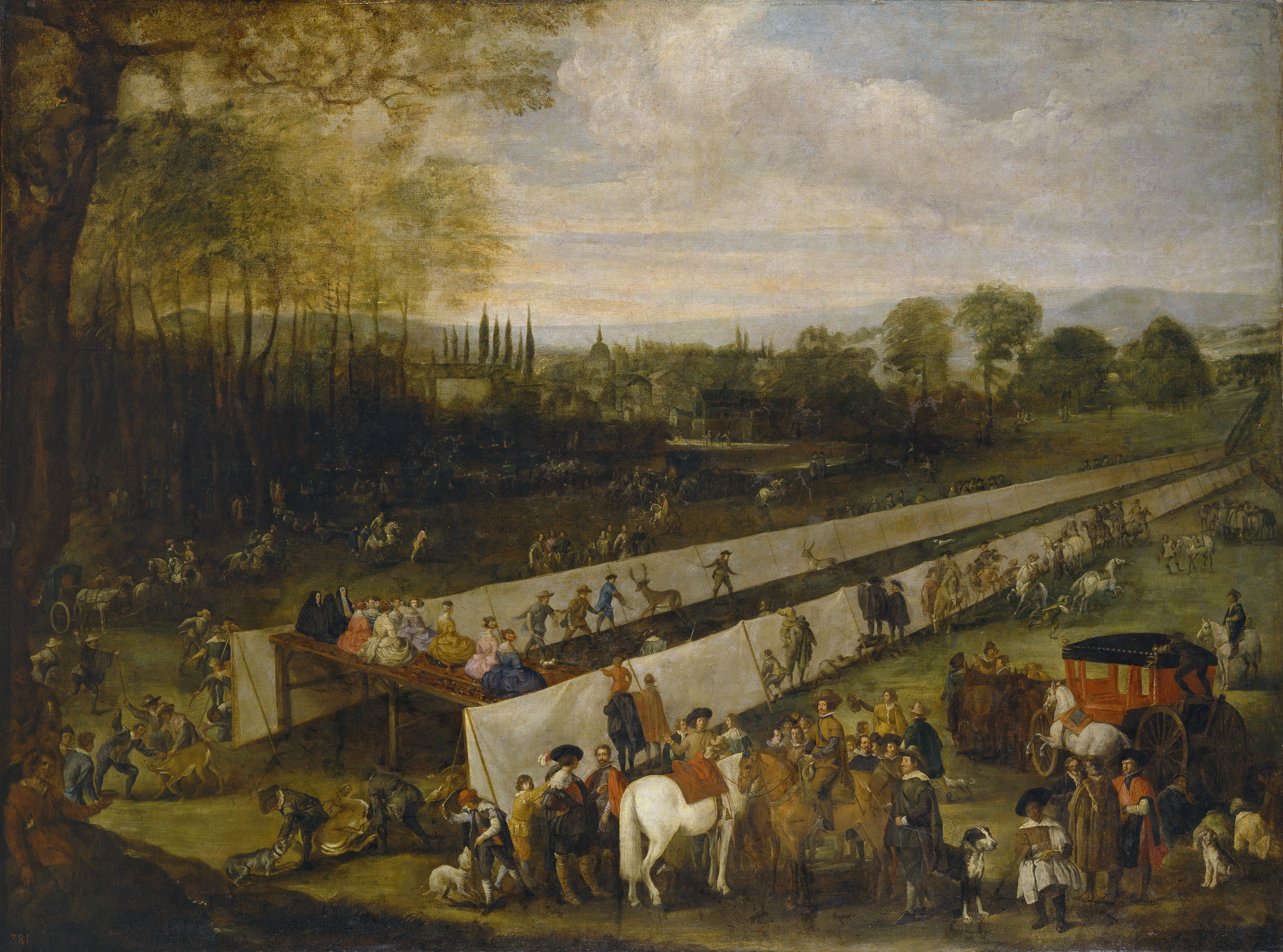
The Stag hunt at Aranjuez by Juan Bautista Martínez del Mazo (1665)

In Góngora's description of the scenery and the characters of the Polifemo, the descriptions themselves become the focus and take on an existence of their own. No longer are properties subordinate to the objects from which they emanate. No longer is there the subjugation of form required in Renaissance art. Instead, the Baroque is often characterized by a breakdown in such distinctions and the deterioration of these established ideals. As with Baroque visual art, within the Polifemo, there is a genuine lack of easily recognizable forms. In turn, this new awareness and appreciation of form in-itself became the chief artistic concern for culteranists, a group of like-minded poets who furthermore celebrated and, at the same time, critiqued the Western Humanist and Hermeneutic traditions of this epoch.

The figures of the Polifemo themselves are often depersonalized by their metaphoric descriptions, by anecdote and by the portrayal of their circumstance or immediate environment in which they are blended. In the context of Baroque aesthetics, depersonalization in this sense is not the complete abandonment or deterioration of the individual as a distinguishable entity, but emphasizes instead the justification of those characters as forms themselves. The objective individual exists as both a series of phenomena as well as an aspect of the overall representation. Conversely, it is the subject who is the ultimate arbiter of artistic experience though they also limited to merely reflect a bundle of individual perceptions and privately held associations. Using this understanding, the distinction between Polyphemus and his cave is no longer deemed relevant as an overarching sympathy exists between the two.

All of these forms serve an aesthetic purpose of preeminent importance as both capture the melancholic sense of longing and neglect that Góngora attempts to develop and incorporate into the overall narration. Ultimately, it is the poet who goes beyond the mere resemblance and commonality of things as orchestrator of inter-subjectivity to both imagine and project a kindred will. This issue of similitude and the underlying perception of persistent sympathies that arise between two separate entities was an idea deeply rooted in the 16th century épistémè, as Michel Foucault exposes in his highly influential work Les Mots et Les Choses.

=== Galatea described – Stanzas 13–17 ===
Góngora portrays Galatea as both the inspiration whom the whole island of Sicily admires and adores. He goes on to deify her in the minds and rituals of the Sicilian locals. Her femininity remains the unparalleled source of inspiration for all of the inhabitants of the island as well as 'the good' (summum bonum), the ultimate pursuit and the sole object of desire. The sanctification of feminine beauty and grace eventually leads to an emerging cult of Galatea.

A Pales su viciosa cumbre debe
Lo que a Ceres, y aun mas, su vega llana;
Pues si en la una granos de oro llueve,
Copos nieva en la otra mil de lana.
De cuantos siegan oro, esquilan nieve,
O en pipas guardan la exprimida grana,
Bien sea religión, bien amor sea,
Deidad, aunque sin templo, es Galatea.

Translation:

To Pales are its rugged peaks indebted
For what are fields, and more, to Ceres owing;
If one is with a rain of gold grains wetted,
Wool flakes in scores are on the other snowing.

Or to those who fleece the snow or gold are moving,
They worship, either out of love, or piety,
Without a temple, Galatea’s deity.

— Translated by Miroslav John Hanak

=== Description of Sicily – 18–24 ===
Sicily, the setting of the tale, resembles the classical archetype of Arcadia. This contrasts sharply with the Darkness of Polyphemus’ cave. Contrasts or dissimilitude were often employed in Baroque art, more so than in the art of the Renaissance. As Enrica Cancelliere explains in her article "Dibujo y Color en la fabula de Polifemo y Galatea", the commonality of aesthetic interests existing between visual and poetic artists was often quite remarkable during the Baroque epoch:

Dentro de la época barroca que privilegia en todas las artes los contrastes a partir de la técnica del claroscuro en pintura, este poema ya desde el título Fábula de Polifemo y Galatea pone de relieve el tema del contraste cromático, el choque entre lo obscuro y lo resplandeciente; un poema escrito, pues, según la técnica del claroscuro. Así Dámaso Alonso escribe: «De un lado lo lóbrego, lo monstruoso, lo de mal augurio, lo áspero, lo jayanesco; de otro, lilio y plata, lo albo, lo cristalino, lo dulce, la belleza mortal. Tema de Polifemo; tema de Galatea». Esta radical técnica pictórica, que en España toma el nombre de tenebrismo, traduce también significados alegóricos, antropológicos y simbólicos: vida-muerte, Eros-Thánatos, gracia-perdición, que llegarán hasta el teatro de Calderón donde semantizarán el verso, matizarán la escena con juegos de luces y sombras que de la escena pasarán al verso y del verso a la escena. Si en los polos hallamos los límites de la escala cromática —el blanco y el negro—, en el interior, el cuadro explota con manchas de color vividas, oximóricas, que a través de sus significados simbólicos construyen imágenes, personajes, paisajes, sentimientos y emociones.

Being a work written during the Baroque Epoch, an epoch which favored the profuse use of contrasts in painting more so than any of the other period in Western History, the Fable of Polyphemus and Galatea takes upon itself this very theme concerning chromatic contrasts, the clash between darkness and radiance. The poem was written with a technique akin to the chiaroscuro style one would see in the visual arts. As Dámaso Alonso wrote: "On one side, there is this gloomy presence, that accompanies that which is monstrous, that which is foreboding, that which is surly, that which is grotesque; at the same time, there is the presence of the precious flower and the purest of silver, that which is immaculate, the crystalline, that which is sweet, immortal and beautiful. What we have, in sum, are the respective domains of Polyphemus and Galatea." This radical technique, which in Spain was dubbed tenebrismo, also applies on the allegorical level in form of the characters and symbols that are depicted: life-death, Cupid-Thanatos, grace-perdition, all of which reemerges in the theatre of Calderón where they assume an intelligible form, they bring harmony to the scene with games of light and shadow that pass from scene to verse y from verse to scene. If at the poles we find the limits of the chromatic scale -white and black-, in the interior, the painting explodes with specks of vivid color, dissolve to the oxymoronic that by means of the underlying symbolic meanings construct whole images, characters, settings, thoughts and emotions.

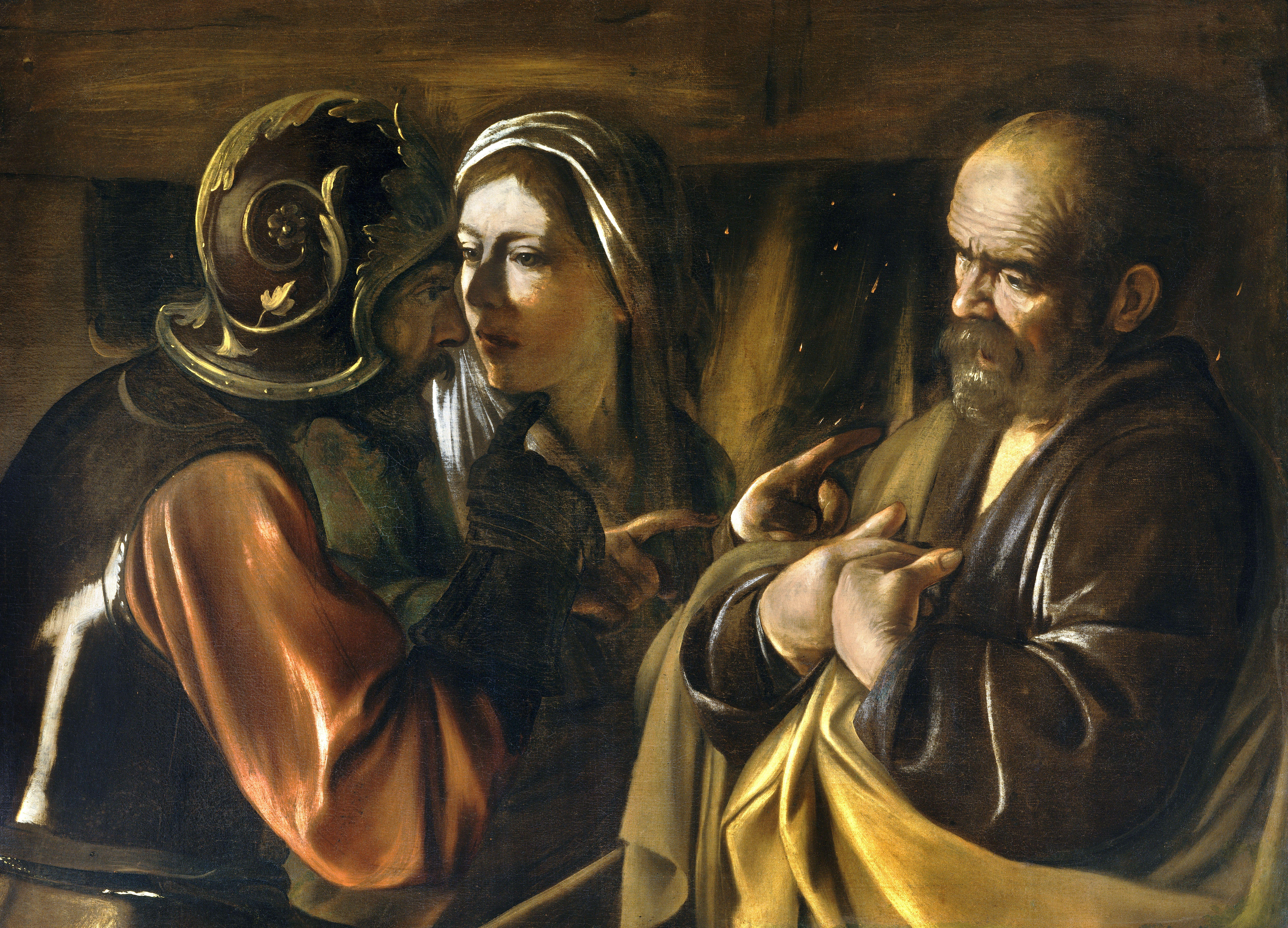
The Denial of St. Peter by Caravaggio (c. 1610)

This poetic trend entranced with antithesis is concurrent with the Chiaroscuro style that matured in 17th century Western painting. The striking contrast of the poem rests in the juxtaposition of the dark, gloomy and burdened existence of Polifemo with the figure of Galatea, the paragon of light, beauty and contentedness.

Description of Acis and the meeting of the lovers – Stanza 25

An interesting correlation of Góngora's poem to that of the classical source is the individual's appeal through his pedigree. The divine lineages of the two suitors, an issue of prevalence within classical works, is incorporated into the poem.

Meeting of the two lovers and courtship – Stanzas 26–37

In these lines, Acis pursues Galatea with a different approach than his wistful cycloptic rival. John McCaw in “Turning a Blind Eye: Sexual Competition, Self-Nontraditional, and the Impotence of Pastoral in Góngora’s Fabula de Polifemo y Galatea” affirms that Acis's courtship stratagem engages the sensuality of Galatea and triumphs over the “contemplative love” of Polifemo. Acis expresses his desire through means of luxurious material offerings, hinting at the old pagan practice of the Anathema, as well as unadulterated “erotic passion” that is not transcendent and thus, anti-intellectual.

The consummation of the lovers – Stanzas 38–42

In these stanzas, Galatea's inaccessible character as an ideal (see Platonic idealism) is made tangible:

“Más agradable y menos zahareña,
Al mancebo levanta venturoso,
Dulce ya concediéndole y risueña
Paces no al sueño, treguas si al reposo.
Lo cóncavo hacia de una pena
A un fresco sitial dosel umbroso,
Y verdes celosías unas hiedras,
Trepando troncos y abrazando piedras.”

“Following the initial shock, Galatea becomes somewhat friendlier and less inaccessible. She coaxes the lucky young man to his feet; sweet and smiling, she is now ready to give, not peace to sleep, but indeed allowing a truce to rest, i.e., not excluding it, but postponing it for later. A hollow rock forms a shady cover for a cool, inviting settee with ivy twines serving as green shutters, climbing around trunks and embracing rocks.”

(English Prose Translation by Miroslav John Hanak)

=== Song of the Cyclops – Stanzas 43–58 ===
Contrary to Acis, Polyphemus represents failed self-cultivation, convention as opposed to nature, and the fruitless application of the virtues of neo-platonic thought, which stressed upward progression, refinement, beauty and universal harmony Unlike the usual burlesque representations of Polyphemus and Galatea (as seen in Theocritus), the words of the Góngora's Cyclops are incongruous with his outward appearance and his essential barbarism. The emphasis on the intellect, the dialectical or, the ancient rationalism Aristophanes satirically labelled as "thinkery" (Phrontisterion - from The Clouds) as well as the vigilance against moral and bodily corruption are central to neo-platonic understanding that finds its way into this bucolic landscape through the most unlikely of characters. Throughout the poem the Cyclops's eye is identified with the sun, a traditional Apollonian symbol for dispassionate truth or enlightenment. The Cyclops realizes his surrogate beauty in the form of discourse and song, which he contrasts with the tangible beauty of a lover.

Sorda hija del mar, cuyas orejas
A mis gemidos son rocas al viento:
O dormida te huerten a mis quejas
Purpúreos troncos de corales ciento,
O al disonante numero de almejas
—marino, si agradable no, instrumento—
Coros tejiendo estés escuchas un día
Mi voz, por dulce, cuando no por mía.

— Stanza 48
Translation:

Deaf daughter of the sea, your ears resistant
Are to my dirges like to winds this boulder:
Either, they’re blocked, when slumber makes you distant
By coral trunks that in the sea waves molder.
Or, the dissonant clash of clams persistent
—An ocean music, yes, and none is bolder—
Lures you to dancing; some day, you’ll discover
My beauty in my voice, not in the lover.

— Translated by Miroslav John Hanak

It is within the Song of the Cyclops where Polyphemus arises from his obscurity. His perpetual pain and incessant longing drive his lyrics. It is through his situation that his art emerges.

As stated by Cancelliere in her investigation of the poem's visual dynamics, primordial darkness itself, embodied by the character of Polifemo, seems to be the recurring cradle and grave of all perception or advancement:

La noche se muda en posibilidad de regeneración y no solamente por la topología uterina del antro sino por el vuelco mismo de la calidad cromática, connotando el negro, la ausencia absoluta de color, una infinita posibilidad receptiva y regeneradora: campo de epifanías de donde se espera que nazcan otra vez la luz, los colores, la profundidad, las apariciones, en fin, la caverna esotérica, sea de Platón, sea de los antiguos ritos iniciáticos y de los misterios.

The night, in its vacuity, welcomes the possibility for redefinition or regeneration and this is possible not merely by means of its concavity, its uterine topology which begs to be filled, but by means of the natural overturning occurring firstly on this very chromatic dimension, connoting the black, the absolute absence of color, an infinite receptive and regenerative possibility: realm of possibilities where one can await the recurrent birth of light, of life, of both profundity and form and, ultimately, the esoteric cavern of Plato, of those ancient rites and of those long forgotten mysteries.

=== Lovers discovered, death and transformation of Acis – Stanzas 59–63 ===
In the versions of both Góngora and Ovid, the ending of the poem is one of violence and transformation. In both tales, after the Cyclops laments, the two lovers are eventually discovered, thus provoking the anger of Polyphemus who strikes the fleeing Acis with a boulder that he rips from the landscape. In both the Latin and the Spanish poem, the youthful Acis is crushed and killed by Polyphemus's striking boulder. Only after violent death is the boy is subsequently transformed into a river.

== Background, the classical precursors of the Polifemo and poetic innovation ==
Though the mythological characters themselves can be traced to various pre-Hellenistic sources, such as book 9 of the Odyssey, the comprehensive artistic representation of the fabled lovers’ tryst, the rejection and consequent dejection of Polyphemus and the subsequent murder of Acis was realized much later in Ovid’s Metamorphoses.

Nevertheless, Ovid was not the first poet to exploit the poetic potential of these mythical figures. Though his influence on this poem is less direct, the founder of the bucolic or pastoral genre, Theocritus, wrote a burlesque poem representing Polyphemus and his unrequited love for the Sea-nymph Galatea. The pastoral genre was subject to later imitation by other prominent figures of antiquity, as seen in Virgil’s Eclogues, as well as by prominent figures of the Italian and Spanish Renaissance, such as Petrarch and Garcilaso de la Vega.

In Theocritus, Ovid and Góngora, the Songs of the Cyclops resemble one another to varying degrees. The two classical poems, which served as the framework for Gongora’s version, are characterized by the Cyclops’s invocation of Galatea which retains both a presumptuous and wistful tone. Some shared characteristics of classical origin are:

1. Theocritus and Ovid have Polyphemus compare Galatea’s physical beauty and allusiveness to natural and pastoral phenomena. The lamenting of Polyphemus is marked by the statement of her rejection of him and his consequent despondence. In Theocritus, “Polyphemus’ four comparisons are with the daily business of agriculture and husbandry, made special nevertheless by the endearing simplicity of this Cyclops.” In contrast, Góngora portrays Polyphemous as deeply poetic and sophisticated despite his ferocious appearance, lifestyle and the egotistical/antisocial disposition.
2. There exists in all three poems a description of his unappealing physical appearance. Góngora's song is more subtle and consciously avoids the burlesque comedy found in Ovid.
3. Polyphemus lists his fecundity or material wealth in all 3 poems.
4. Polyphemus admonishes Galatea to be with him.

Theocritus's version ends in the young Cyclop's self-reprimands. Furthermore, The tone is purely innocent and humorous, while hope for another love remains.

Though other imitations and related works exist, the primary inspiration for Góngora was undoubtedly Ovid who portrayed the tale in a way that conformed to the Metamorphoses's integral theme of transformation where beginnings and ends that feed into one another.

Though the narrative structure differs substantially from that found in Ovid's version, Góngora assumes a similar plot with the Cyclops's murder of Acis followed by the young boy's transformation. Though Ovid's work serves as the thematic and narrative framework for the Polifemo, Góngora doesn’t seem content to merely imitate Ovid. The two poets had different aspirations that are clear to distinguish. In writing the Metamorphoses, Ovid sought to compose a narrative of mythic time united by the theme of constant transformation. Ovid's intention is, thus, cosmological in nature. Given his drastically opposing style and clear deviation from the ancient poet's narrative structure, the Spanish poet attempts to reexamine this popular myth, which grants him wide parameters for the display of his sophisticated wit as well as a peculiar aesthetic sensibility that are not nearly as developed in the Roman's poem.

== Deviations from the Ovidian portrayal and Gongorine innovation ==
There are several notable differences in terms of content that distinguish the Polifemo from its predecessor. As Melinda Eve Lehrer states in her work Classical Myth and the “Polifemo” of Góngora, “Góngora made many innovations in the myth which he inherited from Ovid. Some of them have a merely ornamental function, while others are organically essential to Góngora’s poem.”

There are several ornamental additions that detract from the narration that are obviously not present in its classical counterpart:

O dormida te hurten a mis quejas
Purpúreos troncos de corales ciento,
O al disonante numero de almejas.

— Stanza 48
Translation:

Either, they [Galatea’s ears] are blocked, when slumber makes you distant
coral trunks that in the sea waves molder.
Or, the dissonant clash of clams persistent

Furthermore, as Leher points out, when displaying his wealth and fecundity:

Cuyos enjambres, o el abril los abra,
O los desate el mayo, ámbar destilan
Y en ruecas de oro rayos de sol hilan

— Stanza 50
Translation:

Whose swarms will April free, if not as many
As May unleashes, wax the amber sealing,
As if were sunrays off gold distaffs reeling.

In addition to ornamental descriptions giving life to the Cyclops' mundane possessions, Góngora often incorporates anecdotes that detract from the overall narration as in St. 50-53 regarding the shipwrecked Genoese merchants.

The thematic aloofness of Góngora's verse contrasts sharply with his purely conceptista contemporaries who valued a verbal economy of correspondences and a less convoluted interplay between words (signs) and their meaning (signifiers) as the true testament of wit, which they in turn used to costume a thematic focus. Góngora recreates events by focusing on the sensual impressions granted by the narrative. This reluctance to appeal to or rely on preconceived abstractions and prosaic lexicon and expressions forces the reader to reconstruct meaning. Given his highly sensorial lyrics and his reluctance to directly engage or placate the reader's understanding, literary critics, such as Dámaso Alonso, have labeled Góngora's style as particularly impressionistic.

=== The murder of Acis: Premeditated vs. crime of passion ===
Ovid, Gongora's predecessor, portrays Acis’ murder as a premeditated act:

“Well, he may please himself for all of that, but what I don’t like is, he pleases YOU, Galatea –just let me at the guy, he’ll learn that I’m as strong as I am big! I’ll tear his living guts out and I’ll scatter his body parts in fields and in your waters, so you can mingle with his mangled limbs.”10 (Translation Bk. XIII of the Metamorphoses ln. 1249-1259)

Unlike Ovid, Góngora does not opt for such a calculating and cold-blooded portrayal of Polyphemus and instead stresses the impetuousness of the genuinely committed Cyclops as he accidentally catches the two lovers together:

Viendo el fiero jayan, con paso mudo
Correr al mar la fugitiva nieve
(que a tanta vista el Líbico desnudo
Registra el campo de su adarga breve)—
Y al garzón viendo, cuantas mover pudo
Celoso trueno, antiguas hayas mueve:
Tal, antes que la opaca nube rompa,
Previene rayo fulminante trompa

Translation:

At last, the giant spied the muted paces
Of fleeing snow, as to the sea she hurried
(Such might sight a Libyan buckler traces,
A brief defense, by naked tribesmen carried)—
On seeing Acis, through as many races
His voice beech trees as jealous thunder harried:
So, too, before the livid cloud will sunder,
Before the lightning, trumpets come of thunder

— Translated by Miroslav John Hanak

This underlying difference hints at Góngora's primary concern with form and his concern in capturing the full aesthetic effect through his representation of the emotional torrents of love, jealousy and murder. Stephen Wagschal argues in "Mas no cabrás allá": Góngora's Early Modern Representation of the Modern Sublime” that in doing this, Góngora fully demonstrates the aesthetic character of the sublime, as Kant defined it, where the sublime in its dynamic form inevitably occurs at the climax of the narrative itself. The revelation of betrayal is accentuated by an analogous impression of the sublime as experienced in nature. This impression is the precursor to violence, destruction and the complete devolution of the Cyclops to his natural state. Essentially, Góngora pushes the concept of jealousy to its fullest extent by interfacing the human emotion with its corresponding destructive aspect of nature.

Within the scope of the Polifemo, the presence of ugliness and the grotesque which taints the Arcadian landscape of the pastoral, proves predestined to annihilate both the beauty and harmony inherent in pastoral naivety, something which was cherished in both Renaissance art and the ancient bucolic. Even in paradise, where a harmonious and fruitful relationship between the loved and beloved remains a possibility, love never forms or subsists in a vacuum and is instead constantly tested and reshaped by the external realities that also allowed for it. Love eventually enters into a state of disequilibrium where both exterior circumstance and the instrinsic instability of the emotion jointly transmute the original form. The intemperance of love and the existence of evil as the result neglecting the good are deeply rooted in a non-Christian pagan morality birthed by Socrates in which excess and evil are the products of ignorance, which can be effectively ameliorated with proper education. Evil is a condition when perceived through the lens of this highly deterministic outlook, which contrasts sharpely with the Judeo-Christian explanation for the existence of evil. Instead of relying upon a preexisting cosmological force and the doctrine of Original Sin, the pagans offered a much more rational explanation that rested in the philosophical categorization that delineated the good. All conditions contrary to this understanding were in a sense flawed to various extents (see Nichomean Ethics).

=== The beauty of Galatea: The material vs. the transcendental ===
Within pre-Christian texts the portrayal of Galatea differs drastically from that of early modern depictions. Certain recurrent images present in Ovid and Theocritus that seem to be avoided altogether in Renaissance and Baroque poems are the mundane associations that pertain to her femininity. According to Ignasi Ribó, when emphasizing the blancura or “whiteness” of Galatea, Theocritus and Ovid both utilize the metaphor of milk. In fact, etymologically Galatea can be translated to mean “milk-white.” Nevertheless, within the context of Góngora's poem a reference or metaphor to milk does not occur. Given that Góngora was fully aware of this, it is interesting that he consciously choose to filter this image out of his Polifemo. Ribó notes that Góngora opts instead for other representations of feminine beauty that appeal to the platonic or Marian or Beatricean abstraction of femininity. Some examples are, “más brillante que el cristal” (brighter than cristal) and “más luciente que el hielo” (more translucent than ice). Ribó believes that this transposition of feminine ideal corresponds to the neo-platonic tradition that became exceedingly popular in the later stages of Roman antiquity. These philosophical trends undoubtedly allowed for the gradual Christianization of the empire. Ribó would elaborate that medieval Christianity greatly shaped European perceptions and taste placing parameters on those of even the most avid of Humanists during the Renaissance.

=== Character portrayals: Galatea ===
Ovid seems to represent Galatea as entirely helpless and passive as she laments over the brutality of Polyphemus:

“One day, Galatea, spreading her hair for Scylla to comb, heaved a sigh and said: “You, dear girl, are pursued by the kind of men you would hardly consider uncouth, and you can say no to them, as you do, without a second thought. But consider my case: My father is Nereus; my mother, sea-blue Doris; and I have a group of sisters who protect me; yet I was unable to escape the love of a Cyclops without suffering for it,” and her voice choked with sobs. The girl wiped away Galatea’s tears with a hand white as marble and consoled her, saying, “Tell me about it, dearest, don’t hide your sorrow- you can trust me.”

(Ovid Book XIII of the Metamorphoses ln 742–749. English Translation by Michael Simpson)

Within the Polifemo, Galatea transgresses the established gender roles that were rigidly maintained particularly in 17th century Spain. Góngora places Galatea in a much different light by having her assume a more sexually assertive role. Her shamelessly unrestrained behavior is distinct. Midway through the poem, there is a reversal between the role of the lover (Galatea) and the beloved (Acis). This inversion of the courtly poetry popular in the Middle Ages and the Renaissance in which women were confined to the role of the humble, reticent and inactive role of the beloved spars with the expectations of the 17th century reader.

Despite the sexual overtones of the poem, the Bucolic environment captures the Adamic or Pre-fall Edenic innocence of Western tradition, which effectively predicates the licentious and exploitative associations with human sexuality. In this sense, the poem escapes the regular criticism so prevalent in Góngora's time. The bucolic genre effectively bypassed the social formalities, norms, taboos and concerns of posterior civilization.

=== Physical consummation of the lovers ===
Ovid is not so suggestive and does not note whether or not the love was consummated.

Meanwhile, Góngora makes this evident and limits the ambiguity of the extent of the brief relationship and by doing so Galatea substantiates her latent sexuality.

=== Temporal differences in the narrative ===
Ovid presents the tale as a recollection and incorporates it into other mythological accounts of transformation. His rendering of the tale portrays the act as something already experienced.

As stated by Leher, “Góngora is not interested in this story for the same reason as Ovid. Góngora was interested in this particular story for the contrasts, tensions, and resolutions of the forces which it offered, and his innovations and alterations were directed toward that purpose.” In sum, Góngora seeks to recreate the experience in order to capture the full aesthetic potential provided by the background narrative.

=== Other narrative differences ===
The eloquence of Polifemo's words as he serenades Galatea is particular to Góngora, which contrasts sharply with the grotesque and humorous classical portrayals of the barbarous Cyclops. Góngora chooses to exclude the image of the Cyclops raking (i.e. combing) his hair and other instances in which scrupulous attention is given to his physical appearance. In Ovid, this was used likewise for a humorous effect, which was inappropriate for the graver tone set by Góngora. There are several comedic elements to the ancient texts that were selectively discarded by Góngora.

A noticeable difference is in the discovery of the lovers. While in Ovid, the Cyclops stumbles upon them while he is roaming the countryside, Góngora has the discovery interrupt the song of the Cyclops as he is lamenting. As Lehrer goes on to state in her mythological analysis of the Polifemo, “interruption of a speaker is in fact a motif that occurs in Góngora’s Soledad Primera and suggests displacement and alienation. The interruption of Polifemo’s song resembles a “jog in timing which hastens the denouement of the poem.” Thus, while it does not deviate from the unfolding of the plot, it definitely elicits an aesthetic effect not present in its Roman predecessor.

== The Polifemo and the Renaissance ideal ==
The question of perfection, of a harmonious situation where nothing can be added without worsening conditions for individuals and set relationships, drives the narrative of the Polifemo. Essentially, the poem exposits the implausibility of Arcadia, of an ideal world, given the persistent problem of evil. It presents evil not as an unjustified primordial element independent of humankind, but as a corollary to the finite nature of the material universe. The zero-sum metaphysical assumptions maintained throughout the narrative foment a pervasive sense of competition that prompt egocentric feelings of vanity and jealousy, which together predicate violence and destruction. At the same time, the Polifemo could be interpreted analogically as a commentary of the aesthetic and ethical systems of Gongora's time and place.

Beauty itself as a pleasurable distinction amid a multitude of phenomena can only be made sensible through the necessary existence of the outlying inferior qualities or distinct forms surrounding the object in focus. Beauty as a focused pursuit is reflected in the clear background-foreground distinctions characterizing Renaissance painting. By its scarce and exclusive nature, beauty becomes the unending pursuit or focus endowing the aspirant pursuer with a sense of purpose and meaning. These underlying values are reflected in the prevailing themes of Renaissance literature, particularly intangible beauty and harmonious idealization.

Presupposing the belief that the world resumes under a cyclic progression of infinite transformation, as propounded in the Metamorphoses of Ovid, the situation that originally gives rise to feelings such as love is likewise just as ephemeral or predisposed to change. Within the narrative, tension develops between this intractable and predetermined outlook characterizing Neo-Platonic thought and that of free will, personal accountability and the uniqueness of individual experiences. The very self-contained and immutable reality of things propounded during the height of the Renaissance, in which entities remained suspended in their particular web of semblances and associations, is portrayed as a specious and unavailing contraption or constraining dogma that thoroughly undermines Immanence and the Present by denigrating the very sensibility of phenomena. The poem has anti-intellectual undertones and seems to idealize pagan love as a contrast to both Polifemo's unavailing lamentations that mirror the courtly love poetry popular throughout both Medieval Christendom and the Early Renaissance in addition to the reemerging Platonic strains of thought.

In the Polifemo, the Arcadian world of bucolic poetry proves just as insecure as our own. The world, as the subject experiences it, remains exposed to an array of hostile outside influences that impinge upon our most gratifying experiences. Whether through a direct or indirect capacity, the exterior world inevitably prompts a change in the present arrangement in the very same manner that originally allowed for the conditions at hand. Essentially, life as a continuum of contingent experiences reflects the doctrine of Heracletan flux that greatly influenced the course of Western philosophy. This outlook begs on the part of the subject a reorientation of all outlying perceptions and ultimately renders all teleological equilibria as purely theoretical conceptions. In the midst of flux, the subject is made a victim of his or her circumstance.

The Polifemo reflects a change in the aesthetic and philosophical perceptions of 17th-century Europe. Though the poem does offer a critique of former metaphysical and artistic outlooks, the poem is thoroughly distinct in form. The aesthetic focus, for example, shifts towards the sublime and perhaps this is the most palpable distinction. The poetic style also reflects the prevalent sense of anxiety characterizing both the Baroque period and the historical context of the Counter-Reformation. The liberal use of hyperbaton, antithesis, arcane classical allusions, abstruse metaphors and intricate witticisms mark a genuine distinction from Renaissance poetry (see Euphuism, Culteranismo, Marinismo, Préciosité). During this period, there seems to be an unprecedented focus on artistic form, which is a rather modern preoccupation.

The injustice experienced on a personal level, of change and of loss, offers a different rendition of what is theorized on the plane of remote abstraction. This is perhaps one reason that can explain the anti-intellectual tone maintained throughout the poem. In the face of destruction and suffering, Gongora portrays life as being ultimately redeemed by the sensorial experience of life itself. Pleasure is realized in its absence and full appreciation develops as a result of its loss. Thus, beauty and ugliness, tranquility and turmoil allow for one another, making life sensible through their contrasts. What an experience does not entail allows for the intellection of its reality. Consequently, this understanding would in turn merit a deep appreciation for reality and all it entails, particularly during the artistic process. This novel outlook could explain the fixation with contrasts present throughout Gongora's other works.

During the early 17th century, several scientific and cultural breakthroughs were being made that greatly reshaped Western cosmological perceptions. It seems that Gongora's work reflects this period enmeshed in social upheaval, lingering spiritual doubts and a pervasive feeling of instability. In contrast to the courtly poetry of the Renaissance, the love of Acis and Galatea as portrayed by Gongora is grounded in the innocence of physical attraction, something which had been traditionally marginalized throughout the Middle Ages and Early Renaissance. The actual degeneration of pagan sensibility is rooted in the metaphysical hierarchies of Neoplatonism and its populist successor, Christianity. Sensualism in poetry had always been harangued by Church officials particularly during the Renaissance when there was a renewed interest in Pagan culture. This was understandable given that the literature of antiquity clearly possessed a distinctive ethos that at times drastically opposed the rigid moral standards later established by the Church. The Polifemo ultimately represents the redeeming aspect of love as it arises from and is consequently destroyed by the inscrutable primordial chaos that gives form to passion. The poem celebrates Pagan Love as described by Robert Jammes and conversely criticizes the intellectualism that needlessly justifies and consequently stifles erotic love.

== See also ==
- 1613 in poetry
