= Marquisate of Antella =

Italian noble title

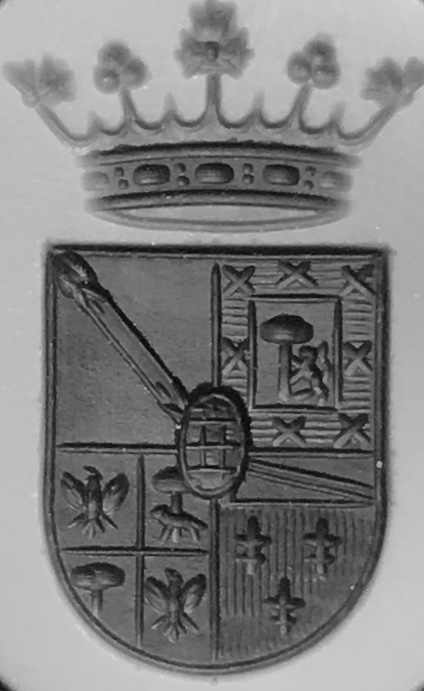
Coat of Arms Marquees of Antella

The marquisate of Antella is a noble title given by the king Philip IV of Spain in Sicily to Nicolo Pallavicino Piamonte on September 22, 1649 due to his support to the Spanish Empire during the Thirty Years War preventing the rebellion of the Neapolitan Republic (1647) and Sicilian rebellion.

Nicolo Pallavicino was a very influent man in Palermo and Genoa as he was the banker of the duchy of Mantua, Vicente I Gonzaga de Mantua and Peter Paul Rubens, in his stay in Genoa, between many others.

== Family ==
Nicolo Pallavicino was coming from the noble Pallavicini Family, before being honored with the "Marquess of Antella" or also known as the "Marquis of Antella" title, Nicolo was married to the Marchioness Maria Serra Pallavicino and after her death he married his second wife Maddalena Strozzi.

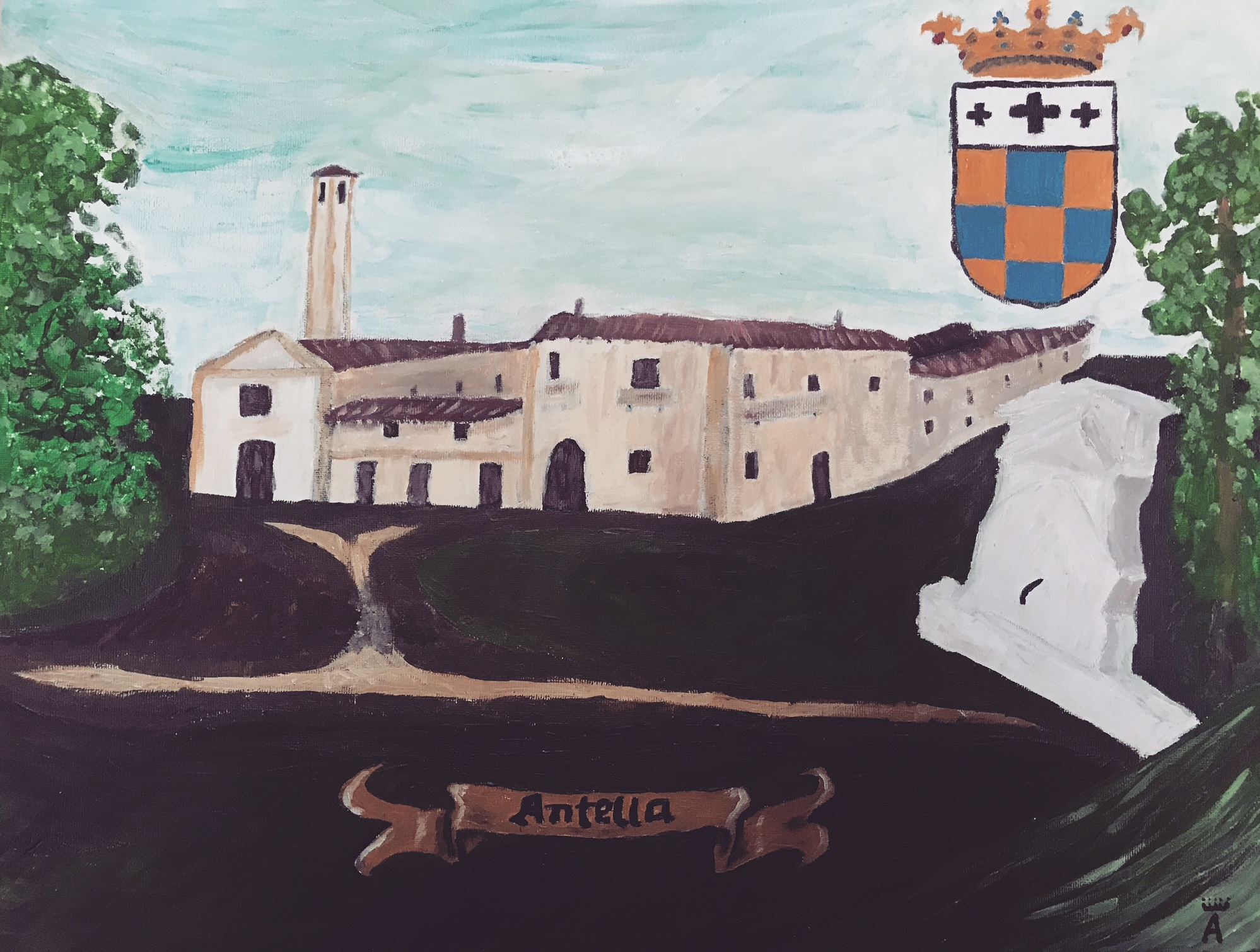
Marquisate of Antella, in the painting can be seen the Antella Cathedral and the city center, Antella is a peripheral city of Florence

== Marquisate ==
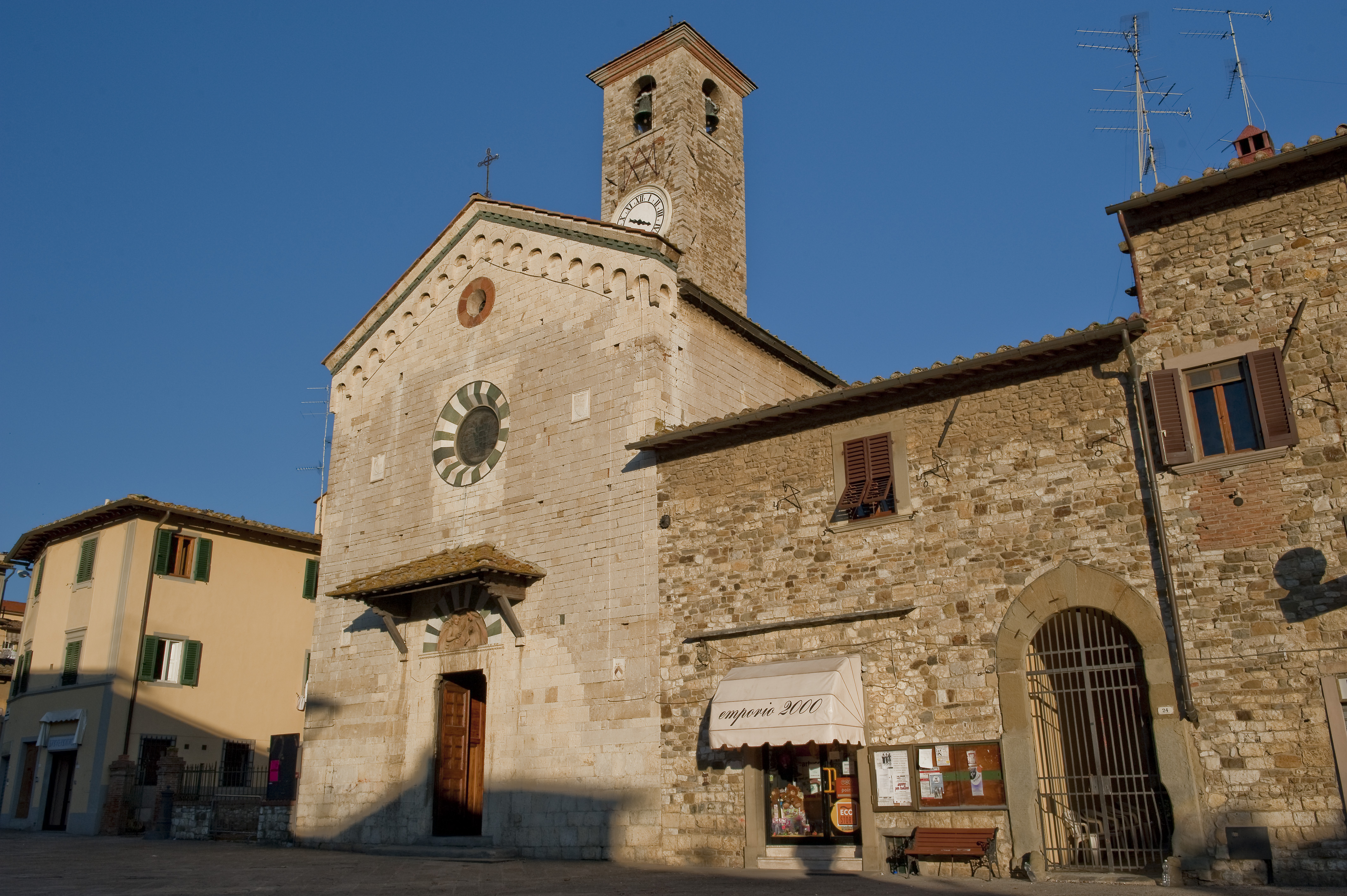
City of Antella nowadays

The marquisate was named after the Italian city of Antella, located in the Tuscany, in the state of Bagno a Ripoli, located 4 miles from Florence.

Coat of Arms: Five blue and four silver squares with a golden top and three flat crosses dressed with a golden marquess crown.

Motto: "Fidelis Regi usque ad mortem"

== Marquisate of Antella's History ==
1. Nicolo Pallavicino, I Marquees of Antella (Sicily 1649), married with marquise Maria Serra Pallavicino. After Nicolo's death in 1650, her second wife Maddalena Strozzi became marquise of Antella.
2. Maddalena Strozzi e di Termine, wife of Nicolo and II marquise of Antella, daughter of Orazio Strozzi marquees of Flowers, who after Nicolo's death married the Prince of Cassaro, passing the Marquis of Antella title to her second son Ottavio.
3. Ottavio Gaetani-Strozzi, III Marquees of Antella, married with Violante Statella Pipi e Salonia
4. Luigi Gaetani e Statella, son of Ottavio and Violante, who got the title in September 1680.
5. (Maria) Gioacchina Gaeteni e Buglio, Princesses of Palagonia, IV Marquise of Antella. She if believed that was the inspiration of Villa Palagonia in Sicily, built by his husband Francesco Ferdinando, Princess of Palagonia.
6. Francisco de Asís Sánchez y Ruiz-Constantino, V Marquees of Antella, rehabilitated the title on October 2, 1981. Supported the king Juan Carlos I of Spain in his succession.
7. Juan Carlos Sánchez Peiro, VI Marquees of Antella. Obtained the title from Francisco after his death, the V marquees, after the Royal Letter to the King on March 2, 1998.
8. Alvaro Sanchez Garcia de Viedma, VII Marquees of Antella. Obtained the title from Juan C. Sanchez after his death, the VI marquees, after the Royal Letter to the King on Dec 26th, 2018.

== Art and portraits ==
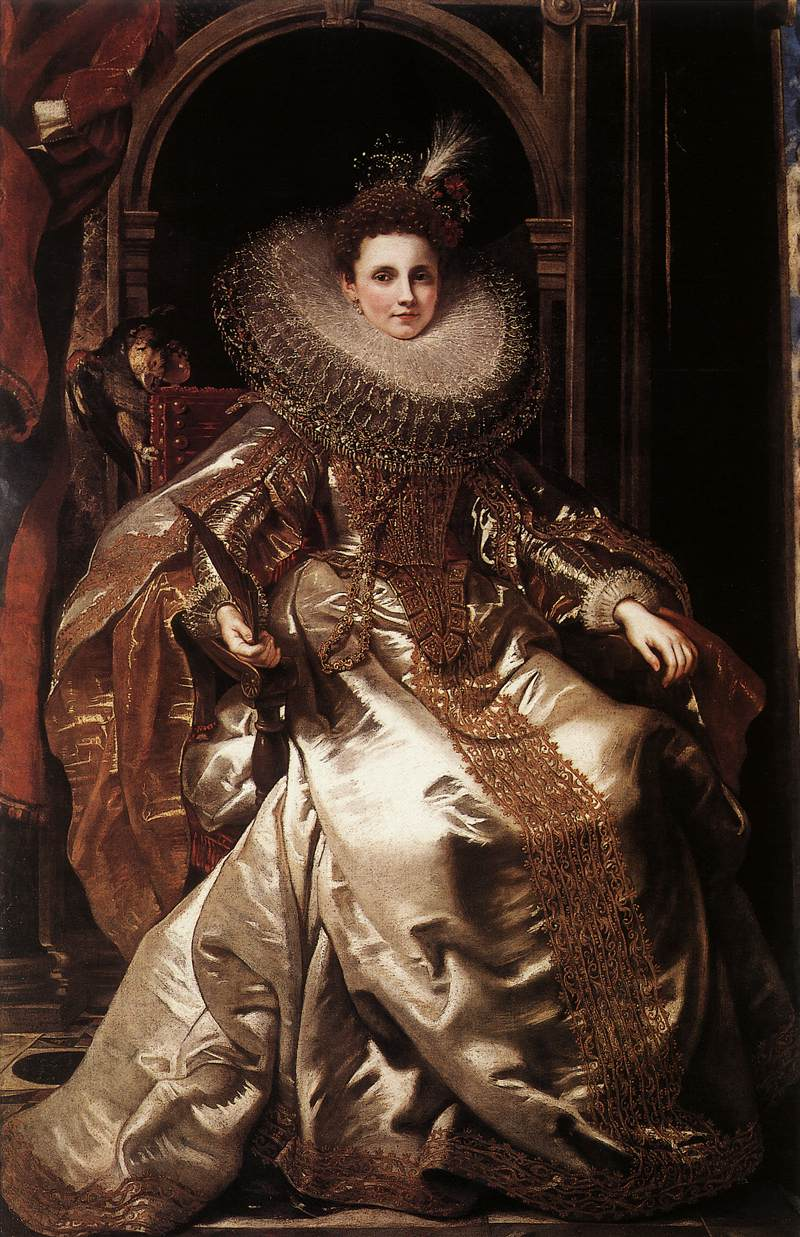
María Serra, Wife of Nicolo Pallavicino, by Rubens

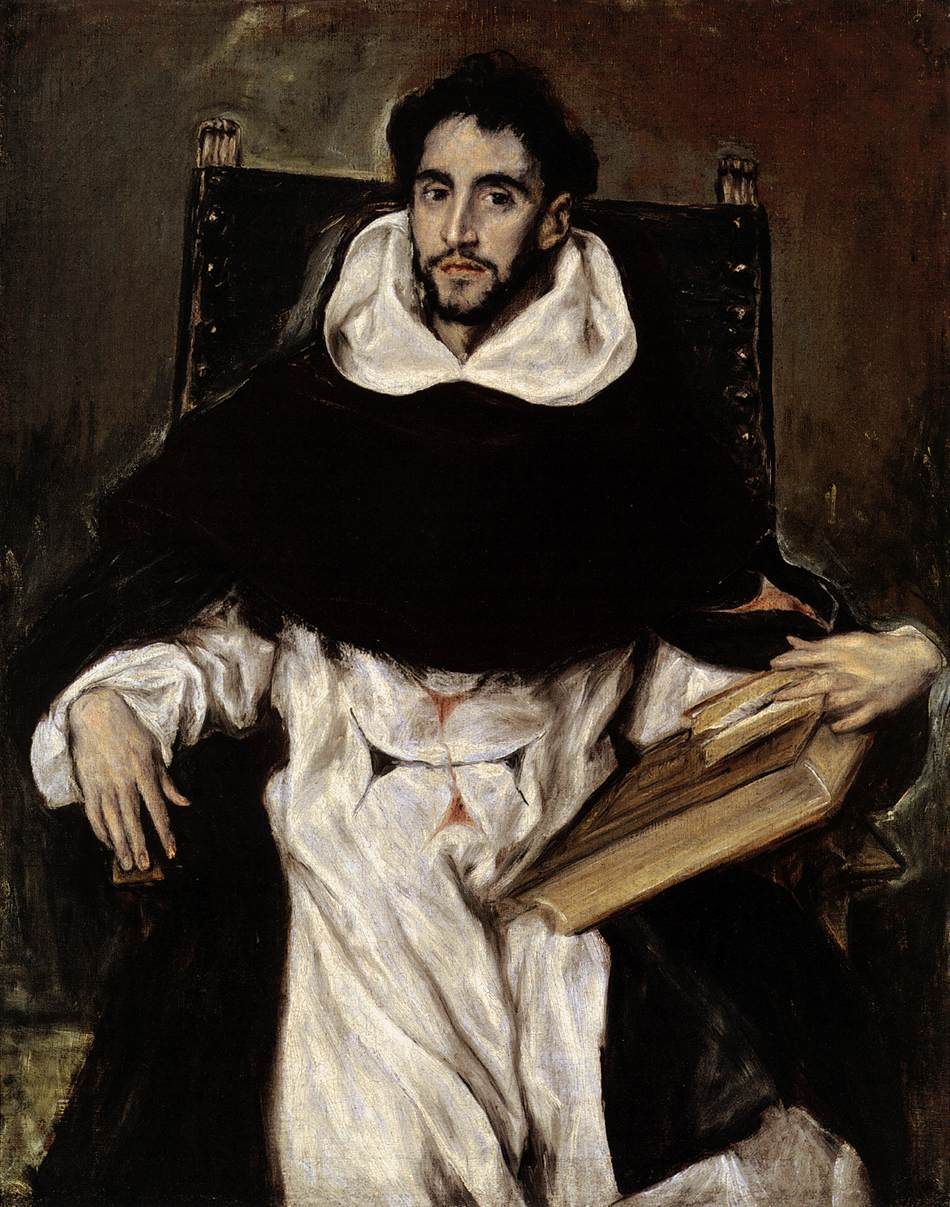
Fray Hortensio de Paravicino, El Greco

Nicolo Pallavicino was portrayed by Peter Paul Rubens in 1604 in Genoa and two years later he also painted his new wife. Years later the marquise of Antella, Gioacchina Gaeteni e Buglio, was also painted and her portrait is at Villa Palagonia.

Nicolo Pallavicino was also family of the religious poet Hortensio Félix Paravicino portrait by El Greco in multiple paintings such as Fray Hortensio Félix Paravicino and the Burial of the Count of Orgaz.

== Buildings named after the noble families Pallavicini, Strozzi and Gaetani ==
- Palace Pallavicini in Vienna, Austria
- Palazzo Pallavicini-Rospigliosi in Rome
- Villa Durazzo-Pallavicini in Genoa, Italy
- Palacio Pallavicini in Bolognia, Italia
- Villa Gandolfi-Pallavicini en Bologna, Italy
- Palazzo Pallavicino in Parma, Italy
- Palacio Strozzi, Italy
- Palazzo Gaetani, Italy

== Bibliography ==
- Francesco Maria Emanuele E. Gaetani Villabianca (Marchese Di) (1757). Della Sicilia nobile opera di Francesco Maria Emanuele e Gaetani: Continuazione della parte seconda, nella quale si ha la storia del baronaggio di questo Regno di Sicilia.
