= Hortensio Félix Paravicino =

Spanish monk and writer (1580–1633)

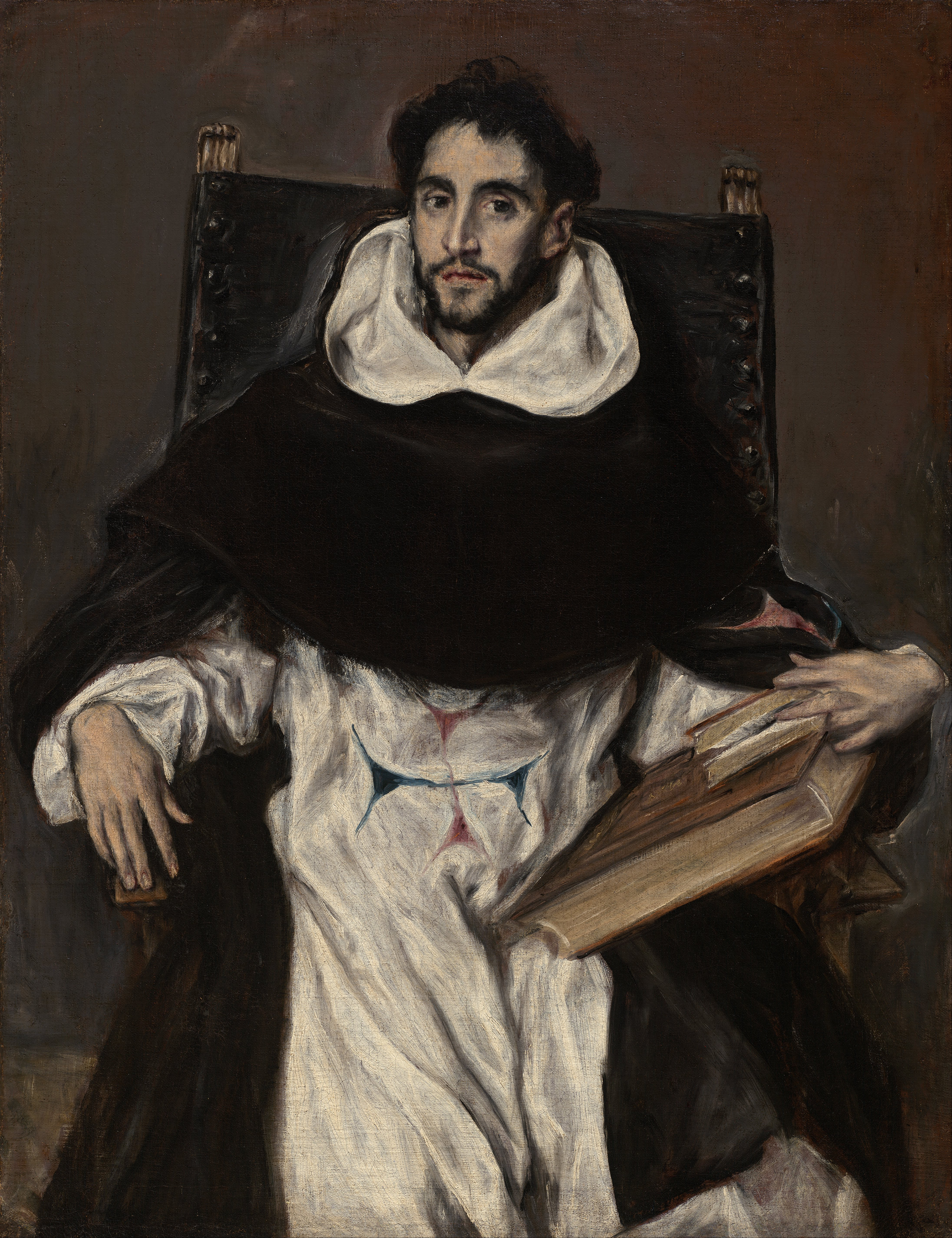
Portrait of Fray Hortensio Félix Paravacino by El Greco circa 1609.

Hortensio Félix Paravicino y Arteaga (12 October 1580 – 12 December 1633) was a Spanish preacher and Culteranismo Baroque poet from the noble house of Pallavicini.

== Life ==
He was born in Madrid and was educated at the Jesuit college in Ocaña, and on April 18, 1600, joined the Trinitarian Order. A sermon pronounced before Philip III at Salamanca in 1605 brought Paravicino into notice; he rose to high posts in his order, was entrusted with important foreign missions, became royal preacher in 1616, and on the death of Philip III in 1621, delivered a famous funeral oration which was the subject of acute controversy.

His Oraciones evangélicas (1638-1641) makes use of extravagant tropes and metaphors. His Obras posthumas, divinas y humanas (1641) include his devout and secular poems, as well as a play entitled Gridonia; his verse, like his prose, shows the influence of Gongora, and were highly regarded in his lifetime. He was a great connoisseur of painting, but argued for the destruction of all paintings of nudes: "the finest paintings are the greatest threat: burn the best of them". However, these views were too extreme for even 17th century Spain, where the King and leading courtiers kept galleries of such works in relatively private rooms, and his piece on the subject was not published in the pamphlet for which it was written.

== In film ==
Fernando Fernández de Córdoba played Paravicino in the 1947 historic drama Lady in Ermine.
