= Luis de Góngora =

Spanish Baroque lyric poet (1561–1627)

The Reverend Luis de Góngora
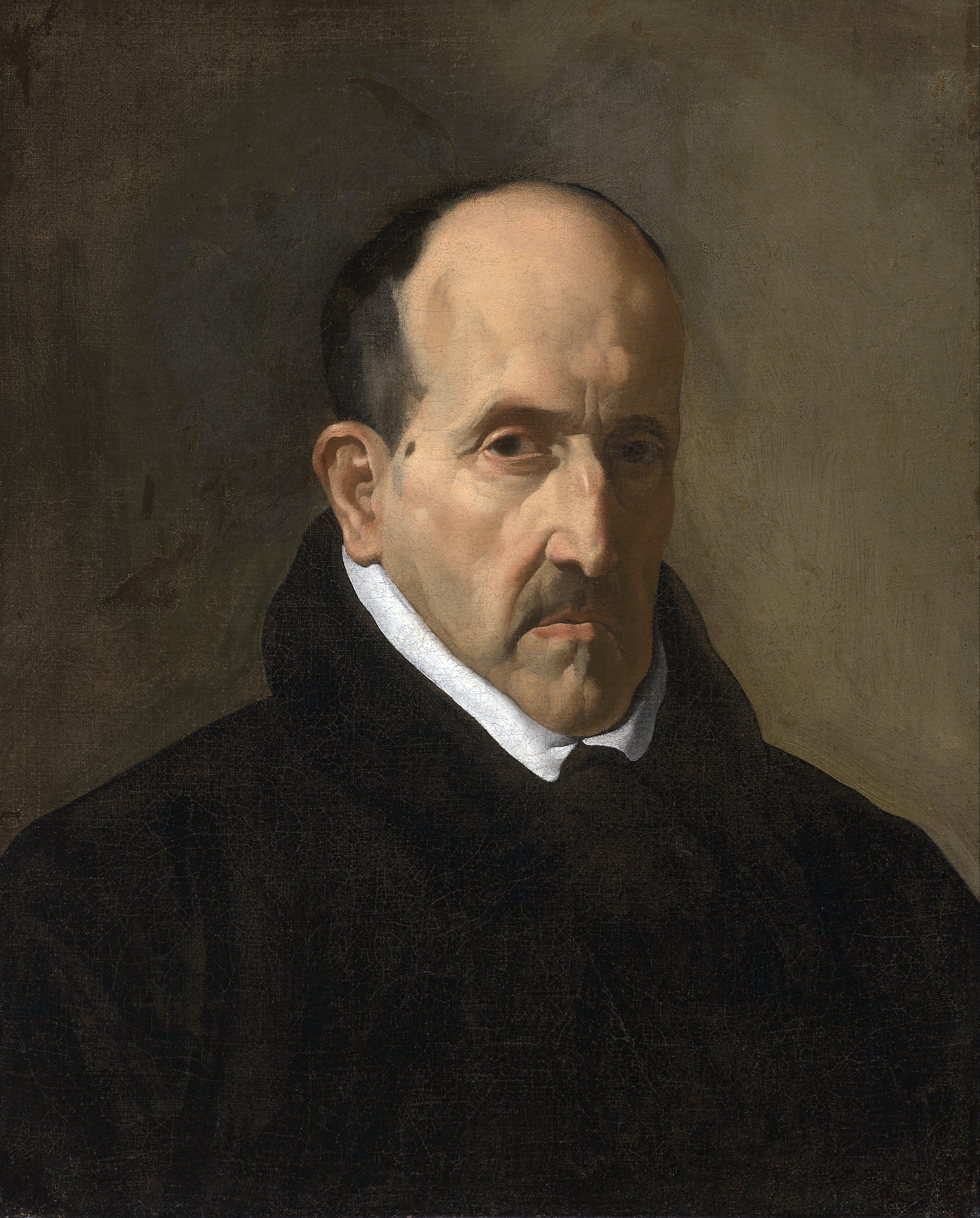
- Luis de Góngora (1622), in a portrait by Diego Velázquez.
- Born: Luis de Argote y Góngora; 11 July 1561; Córdoba, Spain
- Died: 24 May 1627 (aged 65); Córdoba, Spain
- Occupations: Poet, Catholic cleric
- Writing career
- Period: Spanish Golden Age
- Notable work: Las Soledades
- Movement: Culteranismo

Luis de Góngora y Argote (born Luis de Argote y Góngora; Spanish: [lwis ðe ˈɣoŋɡoɾa]; 11 July 1561 – 24 May 1627) was a Spanish Baroque lyric poet and a Catholic priest at Córdoba Cathedral. Góngora and his lifelong rival, Francisco de Quevedo, are widely considered the most prominent Spanish poets of all time. His style is characterized by what was called culteranismo, also known as Gongorismo. This style apparently existed in stark contrast to Quevedo's conceptismo, though Quevedo was highly influenced by his older rival from whom he may have isolated "conceptismo" elements.

== Biography ==
Góngora was born to a noble family in Córdoba, where his father, Francisco de Argote, was corregidor, or judge. In a Spanish era when purity of Christian lineage (limpieza de sangre) was needed to gain access to education or official appointments, he adopted the surname of his mother, Leonor de Góngora. His uncle, Don Francisco, a prebendary of Córdoba Cathedral, renounced his post in favour of his nephew, who took deacon's orders in 1586.

As a canon associated with this cathedral, Luis de Góngora traveled on diverse commissions to Navarre, Andalusia and Castile. The cities that he visited included Madrid, Salamanca, Granada, Jaén, and Toledo. Around 1605, he was ordained priest, and afterwards lived at Valladolid and Madrid. While in Madrid, he was a member of the Medrano Academy (Poetic Academy of Madrid) founded by its president Sebastian Francisco de Medrano between 1616 and 1622.

While his circle of admirers grew, patrons were grudging in their admiration. Ultimately, in 1617 through the influence of the Duke of Lerma, he was appointed honorary chaplain to King Philip III of Spain, but did not enjoy the honour long.

He maintained a long feud with Francisco de Quevedo, who wanted to match his influence in talent and wit. Both poets composed many bitter, satirical pieces attacking one another, with Quevedo criticizing Góngora's penchant for flattery, his large nose, and his passion for gambling. Quevedo even accused his enemy of sodomy, which was a capital crime in 17th century Spain. In his "Contra el mismo (Góngora)", Quevedo writes of Góngora: No altar, garito sí; poco cristiano, / mucho tahúr, no clérigo, sí arpía. (English: There's no altar, but there's a gambling den; not much of a Christian, / but he's very much a cardsharp, not a cleric, definitely a harpy). Góngora's nose, the subject of Quevedo's "A una nariz", begins with the lines: Érase un hombre a una nariz pegado, / érase una nariz superlativa, / érase una alquitara medio viva, / érase un peje espada muy barbado (English: Once there was a man stuck to a nose, / it was a nose more marvellous than weird, / it was a nearly living web of tubes, / it was a swordfish with an awful beard).

This angry feud came to a nasty end for Góngora when Quevedo bought the house Góngora lived in for the sole purpose of ejecting him from it. In 1626 a severe illness, which seriously impaired the poet's memory, forced him to return to Córdoba, where he died the following year. By then he was broke from trying to obtain positions and win lawsuits for all his relatives. He was buried in one of the side chapels in the Mezquita section of the Córdoba Cathedral where his funeral monument can be seen.

An edition of his poems was published almost immediately after his death by Juan López de Vicuña; the frequently reprinted edition by Hozes did not appear until 1633. The collection consists of numerous sonnets, odes, ballads, songs for guitar, and of some larger poems, such as the Soledades and the Fábula de Polifemo y Galatea (Fable of Polyphemus and Galatea) (1612), the two landmark works of the highly refined style called "culteranismo" or "Gongorismo". Miguel de Cervantes, in his Viaje del Parnaso, catalogued the good and bad poets of his time. He considered Góngora to be one of the good ones.

Velázquez painted his portrait. Numerous documents, lawsuits and satires by his rival Quevedo paint a picture of a man jovial, sociable, and talkative, who loved card-playing and bullfights. His bishop accused him of rarely attending choir, and of praying less than fervently when he did go. Góngora's passion for card-playing ultimately contributed to his ruin. Frequent allusions and metaphors associated with card-playing in Góngora's poetry reveal that cards formed part of his daily life. He was often reproached for activities beneath the dignity of a churchman.

== Style ==
Culteranismo apparently existed in stark contrast with conceptismo, another movement of the Baroque period which is characterized by a witty style, wordplay, simple vocabulary, and conveying multiple meanings in as few words as possible. However, all elements of "conceptismo" were already present in Góngora's late style, which was passionately debated and misunderstood even by his defenders. The best-known representative of Spanish conceptismo, Francisco de Quevedo, had an ongoing feud with Luis de Góngora in which each criticized the other's writing and personal life.

The word culteranismo blends culto ("cultivated") and luteranismo ("Lutheranism") and was coined by its opponents to present it as a heresy of "true" poetry. The movement aimed to use as many words as possible to convey little meaning or to conceal meaning. "Góngora's poetry is inclusive rather than exclusive", one scholar has written, "willing to create and incorporate the new, literally in the form of neologisms."

Góngora had a penchant for highly Latinate and Greek neologisms, which his opponents mocked. Quevedo lampooned his rival by writing a sonnet, "Aguja de navegar cultos," which listed words from Góngora's lexicon: "He would like to be a culto poet in just one day, / must the following jargon learn: / Fulgores, arrogar, joven, presiente / candor, construye, métrica, armonía..." Quevedo actually mocked Góngora's style in several sonnets, including "Sulquivagante, pretensor de Estolo." This anti-Gongorist sonnet mocks the supposed unintelligibility of culteranismo and its widespread use of flowery neologisms, including sulquivagante (he who plies the seas; to travel without a clear destination); speluncas ("caves"); surculos (sprouts, scions). He was also the first to write poems imitating the speech of blacks. Góngora also had a penchant for apparent breaks in syntactical flow, as he overturned the limitations of syntax, making the hyperbaton the most prominent feature of his poetry.

He has been called a man of "unquestioned genius and almost limitless culture, an initiator who enriched his language with the vast power, beauty, and scope of a mighty pen." As far away as Peru, he received the praise of Juan de Espinosa Medrano (ca. 1629–1688), who wrote a piece defending Góngora's poetry from criticism called Apologético en favor de Don Luis de Góngora, Príncipe de los poetas lyricos de España: contra Manuel de Faria y Sousa, Cavallero portugués (1662).

As Dámaso Alonso has pointed out, Góngora's contribution to the Spanish language should not be underestimated, as he picked up what were in his time obscure or little-used words and used them in his poetry again and again, thereby reviving or popularizing them. Many of these words are quite common today, including all the words mocked by Quevedo in the above quoted line (fulgores, arrogar, joven, presiente, candor, construye, métrica, armonía) and many others such as adolescente, asunto, brillante, construir, eclipse, emular, erigir, fragmento, frustrar, meta, and porción.

== Works ==
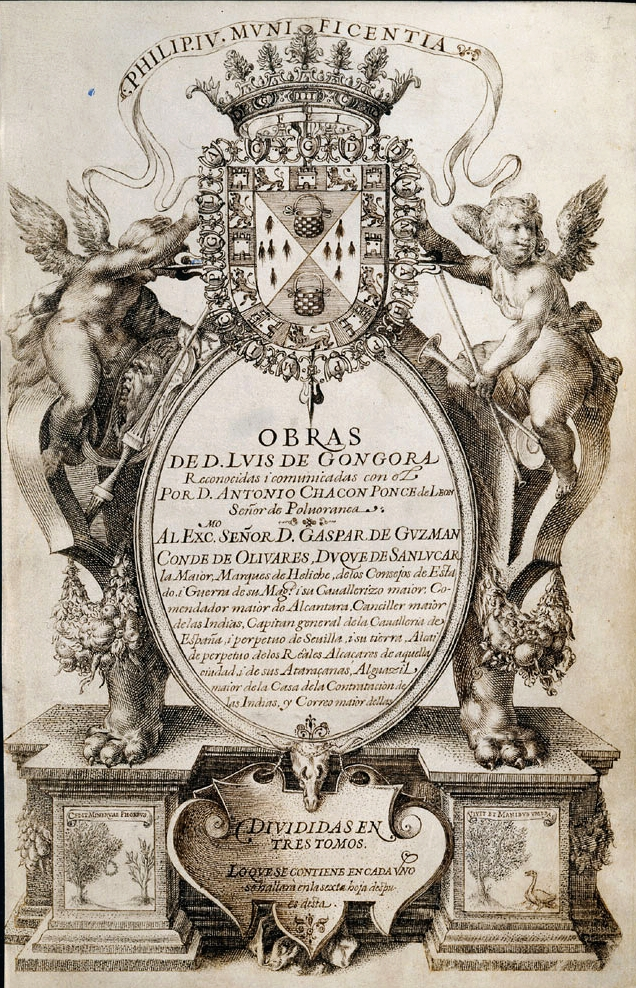
Title page of the Chacon Manuscript.

Góngora's poems are usually grouped into two blocks, corresponding more or less to two successive poetic stages. His Fábula de Polifemo y Galatea (Fable of Polyphemus and Galatea) and his Soledades (1613) are his best-known compositions and the most studied. The Fábula is written in royal octaves (octavas reales) and his Soledades is written in a variety of metres and strophes, but principally in stanzas and silvas interspersed with choruses.

Góngora's Fábula de Polifemo y Galatea (1612) narrates a mythological episode described in Ovid's Metamorphoses: the love of Polyphemus, one of the Cyclopes, for the nymph Galatea, who rejects him. In the poem's end, Acis, enamored with Galatea, is turned into a river.

Góngora's Fábula de Píramo y Tisbe (Fable of Pyramus and Thisbe) (1618) is a complex poem that mocks gossiping and avaricious women. Góngora also wrote sonnets concerning various subjects of an amatory, satirical, moral, philosophical, religious, controversial, laudatory, and funereal nature. As well as the usual topics (carpe diem etc.) the sonnets include autobiographical elements, describing, for example, the increasing decrepitude and advancing age of the author. In addition, Góngora composed one of his most ambitions works, El Panegírico al Duque de Lerma (1617), a poem in 79 royal octaves. Cervantes, after reading "El Panegírico", said: "the [work] I most esteem from those I've read of his."

He also wrote plays, which include La destrucción de Troya, Las firmezas de Isabela, and the unfinished Doctor Carlino.

Although Góngora did not publish his works (he had attempted to do so in 1623), manuscript copies were circulated and compiled in cancioneros (songbooks), and anthologies published with or without his permission. In 1627, Juan Lopez Vicuña published Verse Works of the Spanish Homer, which is also considered very trustworthy and important in establishing the Góngora's corpus of work. Vicuña's work was appropriated by the Spanish Inquisition and was later surpassed by an edition by Gonzalo de Hozes in 1633.

== Góngora and the Generation of '27 ==
The Generation of '27 took its name from the year 1927 in which the tricentennial of Góngora's death, ignored by official academic circles, was celebrated with recitals, avant-garde happenings, and an ambitious plan to publish a new critical edition of his work, as well as books and articles on aspects of his work that had not been fully researched.

The Generation of '27 was the first to attempt to self-consciously revive baroque literature. Dámaso Alonso wrote that Góngora's complex language conveyed meaning in that it created a world of pure beauty. Alonso explored his work exhaustively and called Góngora a "mystic of words." Alonso dispelled the notion that Góngora had two separate styles – "simple" and "difficult" poems – that were also divided chronologically between his early and later years. He argued that Góngora's more complex poems built on stylistic devices that had been created in Góngora's early career as a poet. He also argued that the apparent simplicity of some of Góngora's early poems is often deceptive.

Rafael Alberti added his own Soledad tercera (Paráfrasis incompleta). In 1961, Alberti declared, "I am a visual poet, like all of the poets from Andalusia, from Góngora to García Lorca."

García Lorca presented a lecture called "La imagen poética en don Luís de Góngora" at the Ateneo in Seville in 1927. In this lecture, García Lorca paid Jean Epstein the compliment of comparing the film director with Góngora as an authority on images.

== References in fiction and philosophy ==
The philosopher Baruch Spinoza proposed in his Ethics (1677) that a man can die before his body stops moving. As an example he mentioned "a Spanish poet who suffered an illness; though he recovered, he was left so oblivious to his past life that he did not believe the tales and tragedies he had written were his own". The historian Carl Gebhardt wrote that "this was probably Góngora, whose works Spinoza possessed, and who lost his memory a year before his death".

The narrator of the Captain Alatriste series, a friend of Francisco de Quevedo within the stories, illustrates Góngora's feuding with Quevedo, both by quoting poetry from each as well as describing Quevedo's attitude toward Góngora through the course of the story. Excerpts of poetry from one against the other are included within the story itself and poetry from each is included at the back of some of the books.

In Giannina Braschi's bilingual novel Yo-Yo Boing! (1998) contemporary Latin American poets have a heated debate about Góngora's and Quevedo's role in defining the Spanish Empire through their works.

The musical group Dead Can Dance used an English translation of Góngora's Da bienes Fortuna as the lyrics for the song "Fortune Presents Gifts Not According to the Book" on their 1990 album Aion.

In the second of the five parts of Roberto Bolaño's novel 2666 (published posthumously in 2004), "The Part about Amalfitano", one of the characters (the poet, whose name is never explicitly stated) quotes a verse from Góngora: Ande yo caliente y ríase la gente.

John Crowley's novel The Solitudes (a.k.a. Aegypt, 1987) repeatedly refers to and quotes from Góngora's poem Soledades.

A portrait of Luis de Góngora appears as an Easter egg in the 2018 video game Detroit: Become Human. This inclusion likely serves as a symbolic reference to the game's exploration of themes such as identity, the human condition, and the blurred lines between appearance and reality—concepts that Góngora's poetry often delved into.

== Sources ==
- Chisholm, Hugh, ed. (1911). "Góngora y Argote, Luis de" . Encyclopædia Britannica. Vol. 12 (11th ed.). Cambridge University Press. pp. 233–234.
- Hennigfeld, Ursula (2008). Der ruinierte Körper. Petrarkistische Sonette in transkultureller Perspektive. Würzburg: Königshausen & Neumann.
- Spinoza, Baruch (1677/1985). Ethics. In The Collected Works of Spinoza, volume 1. Edited and translated by Edwin Curley. Princeton, N.J.: Princeton University Press.
