= Portrait of Fray Hortensio Félix Paravacino =

1609 painting by El Greco

Portrait of Fray Hortensio Félix Paravicino
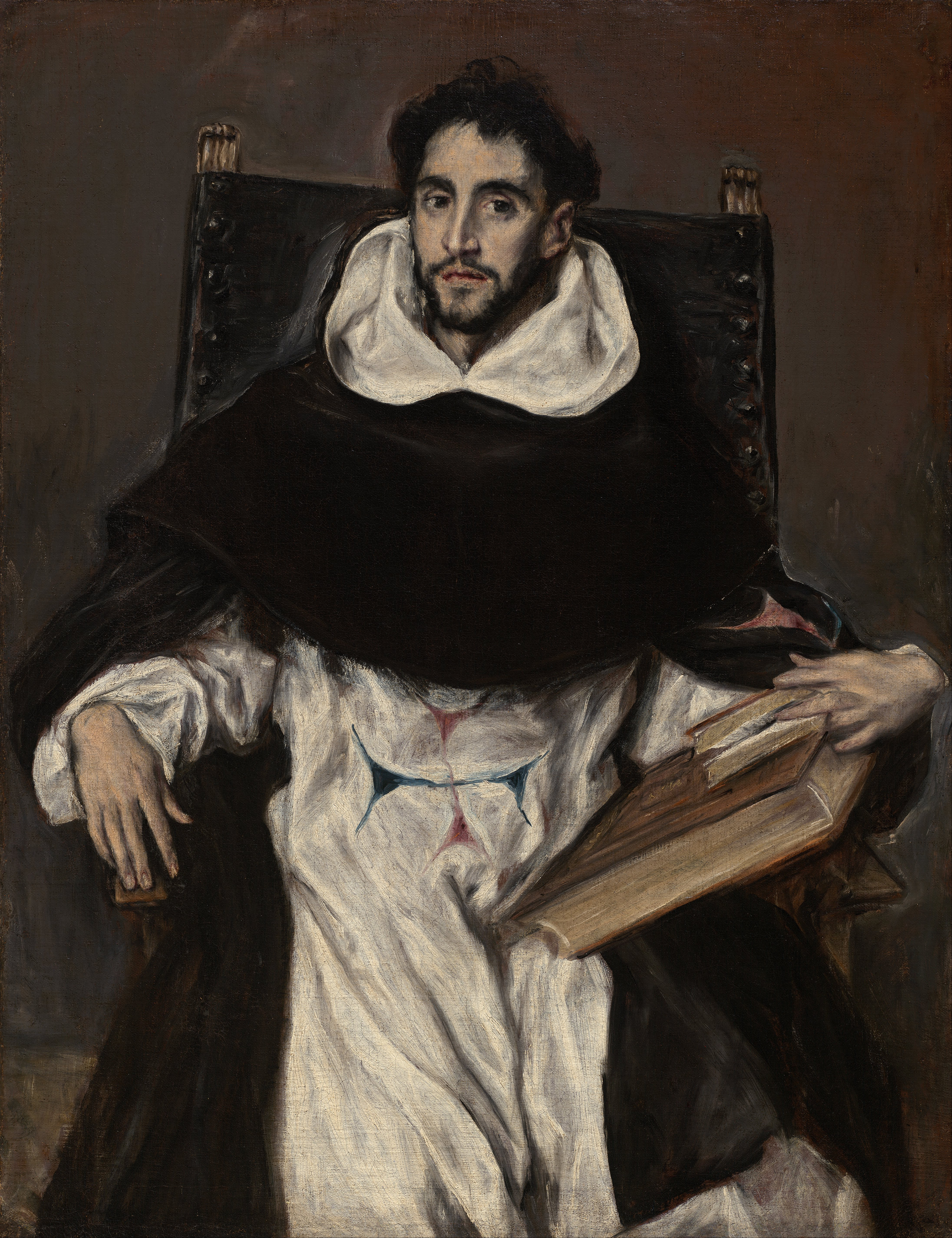
- Artist: El Greco
- Year: 1609
- Medium: oil on canvas
- Dimensions: 112.1 cm × 86.1 cm (44.1 in × 33.9 in)
- Location: Museum of Fine Arts, Boston

Portrait of Fray Hortensio Félix Paravicino is a 1609 oil on canvas painting by El Greco, now in the Museum of Fine Arts, Boston. It shows Hortensio Félix Paravicino, a monk of the Trinitarian Order and major Spanish poet who was also a close friend of the painter. He is shown in the Trinitarian habit.

== See also ==
- List of works by El Greco

== Bibliography ==
- (in Spanish) ÁLVAREZ LOPERA, José, El Greco, Madrid, Arlanza, 2005, Biblioteca «Descubrir el Arte», (colección «Grandes maestros»). ISBN 84-95503-44-1.
- (in Spanish) SCHOLZ-HÄNSEL, Michael, El Greco, Colonia, Taschen, 2003. ISBN 978-3-8228-3173-1.
