= Ignasi Ribó =

- Born: Ignasi Ribó Labastida; 3 August 1971 (age 55); Barcelona, Catalonia, Spain
- Education: Licentiate, M.B.A., D.Phil
- Alma mater: ESADE, Ramon Llull University
- Occupation: Writer
- Website: https://www.ignasiribo.com/

Ignasi Ribó (born 1971 in Barcelona) is a Catalan writer. He is Doctor of Philosophy from the University of Sussex and holds graduate degrees in Economics, Political Science and Literary Theory. He is the author of the eco-political theory of the habitat-nation, developed in his book Habitat: The Ecopolitical Nation (2012).

== Essay ==
- Habitat: The Ecopolitical Nation. Mycelia Books, London, 2012.
- De la indignació a la nació. Mycelia Books, London, 2012.
- La teoria literària. Ediuoc, Barcelona, 2011.

== Fiction ==
- La palma y el laurel. Edhasa, Barcelona, 2011.
- Mitrídates ha muerto, Bubok, 2010.
- Polifemo. Edhasa, Barcelona, 2005.
- La ley de la gravedad, Edhasa, Barcelona, 2001. (held in several dozen US libraries according to WorldCat)
- També somien els búfals, Empúries, Barcelona, 2000.

== Prizes ==
- Clara de nit. Prize Joan Santamaria, 2000.
- Clear Night. Boomerang Theatre First Flight Dramatic Reading Series, New York, 2001.

== Habitat-Nation Theory ==
In 2012, Ignasi Ribó developed the political (or 'eco-political') theory of the habitat-nation, exposed in his book Habitat: The Ecopolitical Nation. According to this theory, in the political organisation of human communities there is an alternative to the dominant model of the nation-state in the form of what he calls the 'habitat-nation'. The habitat-nation is a political community based on four main elements: (1) inhabitants - the individuals of all species that compose it; (2) habits - genetically and socially acquired dispositions of individuals or groups; (3) forms of habitation - set of strategies, practices and institutions that allow individuals and groups to adapt to their particular environment; and (4) habitat - a given natural environment. In his essay, Ignasi Ribó claims that the model of the habitat-nation could favour the development of a free, fair and cohesive society (what he calls the 'philial society'), based on the sustainability of cohabitation and on the eco-liberal principles of justice (liberty, fairness, care).

Ribó defines the habitat-nation as

the community of individuals (inhabitants) who share a way of being, due to the confluence of genetically and socially acquired dispositions (habits), as well as the set of strategies, practices and institutions (forms of habitation) that allow them to adapt to (inhabit) a given natural environment (habitat) in a sustainable manner, thanks to the bonds of autonomy, reciprocity and friendship.

In his book, Ribó applies this theory to support the view that a sustainable world system can only be achieved by developing political communities of smaller size than the large states of the modern era. According to this analysis, existing small nations like Denmark, Ireland or the Netherlands, but also emerging small nations, like Scotland, Catalonia or Bavaria, are better prepared to establish democratic, prosperous and sustainable polities, particularly when they are able to form effective confederations at a continental level.

In Michael Menser's opinion, "Ribó’s combination of classic figures, moral argument, and contemporary politics is a welcome and timely contribution to ecological and political theory".

According to Guy Lancaster, "Habitat is the sort of work that has fallen out of favour these days—an imaginative prescription for creating the best of all possible worlds. In addition, Ribó manages to propose a sense of community that expands beyond the boundaries of the homo sapiens species without resorting to the mysticism of bioregionalists or Gaia hypothesis adherents."
