= Culteranismo =

Spanish stylistic movement in the Baroque period

Culteranismo is a stylistic movement of the Baroque period of Spanish history that is also commonly referred to as Gongorismo (after Luis de Góngora). It began in the late 16th century with the writing of Luis de Góngora and lasted through the 17th century.

Culteranismo is characterized by an ornamental, ostentatious vocabulary and a message that is complicated by a heavy use of metaphors and latinate complex syntactical order. The name blends culto ("cultivated") and luteranismo ("Lutheranism") and was coined by its opponents to present it as a heresy of "true" poetry.

" Estas que me dictó, rimas sonoras, / Culta sí aunque bucólica Talía, / Oh excelso Conde, en las purpúreas horas / Que es rosas la alba y rosicler el día, / Ahora que de luz tu niebla doras, / Escucha, al son de la zampoña mía, / Si ya los muros no te ven de Huelva / Peinar el viento, fatigar la selva."

—Luis de Góngora, Fábula de Polifemo y Galatea, 1612

Poetry from this movement seems to use as many words as possible to convey little meaning or to conceal meaning. It is also associated with Latinized syntax and mythological allusions.

Culteranismo existed in stark contrast with conceptismo, another movement of the Baroque period which is characterized by a witty style, word games, simple vocabulary, and an attempt to convey multiple meanings in as few words as possible. The best-known representative of Spanish conceptismo, Francisco de Quevedo, had an ongoing feud with Luis de Góngora in which each criticized the other's writing and personal life.

Other practitioners of the style include Hortensio Félix Paravicino.

== Sample ==
The first stanza of the first of the Soledades by Góngora.

Original Spanish	Literal translation	Explanation
Era del año la estación florida	It was the flowery season of the year	It was spring.
en que el mentido robador de Europa	when the perjured kidnapper of Europa	Zeus kidnapped Europa in the shape of a bull.
(media luna las armas de su frente,	(half moon the arms of his forehead	The bull's weapons (horns) are shaped as a crescent.
y el Sol todos los rayos de su pelo),	and the Sun all the beams of his hair),	The Sun is currently in Taurus
luciente honor del cielo,	brilliant honor of the sky	(the constellation of the Zeus bull)
en campos de zafiro pace estrellas,	in fields of sapphire grazes [on] stars	i.e., it is between April and May.

== Notable figures ==
- Luis de Góngora
- Hortensio Félix Paravicino
- Conde de Villamediana
- Juana Inés de la Cruz

== See also ==
- Hiberno-Latin, a style of Latin poetry by Irish monks, with a similarly contrived vocabulary.
- Euphuism, a similar style in English prose.
- Préciosisme, a similar style in French high society.
- Marinism, a similar style in Italian poetry.
