= John Dee =

English scientist and occultist (1527–1608/09)

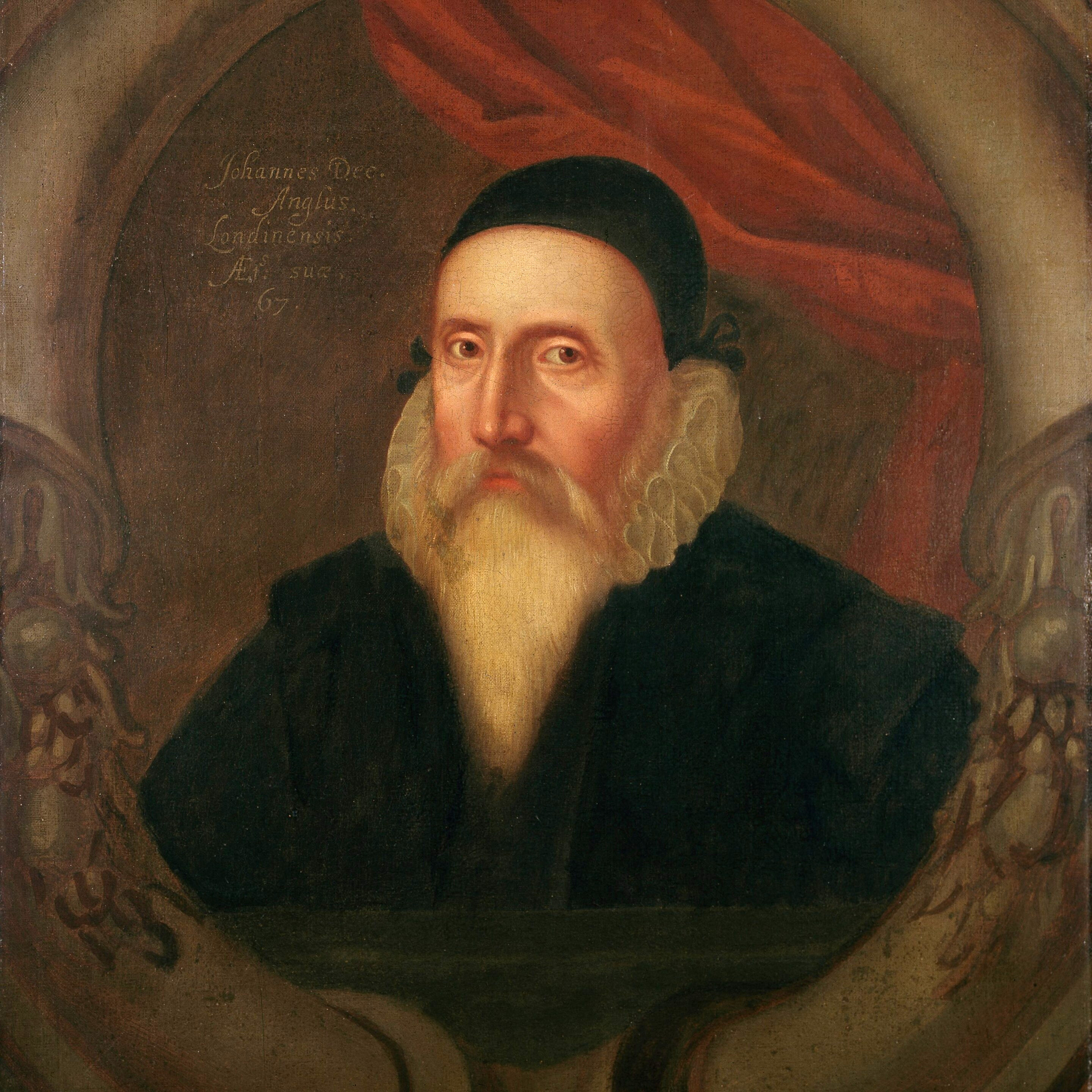
- Portrait of Dee, c. 1594 (Note: According to Fell Smith 1909 it was painted when Dee was 67. It belonged to a grandson, Rowland Dee, and later to Elias Ashmole, who left it to Oxford University.)
- Born: 13 July 1527; Tower Ward, London, England
- Died: December 1608 or March 1609 (aged 81); Mortlake, Surrey, England
- Education: St John's College, Cambridge; Louvain University
- Known for: Advisor to Queen Elizabeth I
- Spouses: Katherine Constable (m. 1565; died 1574) Unknown (m. 1575; died 1576) Jane Fromond (m. 1578; died 1604)
- Children: 7 or 8 (incl. Arthur)
- Scientific career
- Fields: Mathematics, alchemy, astrology, Hermeticism, navigation
- Workplaces: Trinity College, Cambridge; Christ's College, Manchester
- Academic advisors: Gemma Frisius, Gerardus Mercator
- Notable students: Thomas Digges

John Dee (13 July 1527 – December 1608 or March 1609) was an English mathematician, astronomer, teacher, astrologer, occultist, and alchemist. He was the court astronomer for, and advisor to, Elizabeth I, and spent much of his time on alchemy, divination, and Hermetic philosophy. As an antiquarian, he had one of the largest libraries in England at the time. As a political advisor, he advocated the foundation of English colonies in the New World to form a "British Empire", a term he is credited with coining.

Dee eventually left Elizabeth's service and went on a quest for knowledge of the occult and supernatural. He aligned himself with several individuals who may have been charlatans, travelled through Europe, and was accused of spying for the English Crown. Upon his return to England, he found his home and library vandalised. He eventually returned to the Queen's service, but was turned away when she was succeeded by James I. He died in poverty in London, and his gravesite is unknown.

== Biography ==
=== Early life ===
Dee was born in Tower Ward, London, to Rowland Dee, of Welsh descent, and Johanna, daughter of William Wild. His surname "Dee" is an anglicisation of Welsh du (black). His grandfather was Bedo Ddu of Nant-y-groes, Pilleth, Radnorshire; John retained his connection with the locality. His father, Roland, was a mercer (cloth merchant) and gentleman courtier to Henry VIII. Dee traced descent from Rhodri the Great, 9th-century ruler of the Kingdom of Gwynedd, and constructed a pedigree accordingly. His family had arrived in London around the time of Henry Tudor's coronation as Henry VII.

Dee attended Chelmsford Chantry School (now King Edward VI Grammar School, Chelmsford) from 1535 to 1542. He entered St John's College, Cambridge, in November 1542, aged 15, graduating with a BA in 1545 or early 1546. His abilities recognised, he became an original fellow of Trinity College, Cambridge, upon its foundation by Henry VIII in 1546. At Trinity, he designed stage effects for a production of Aristophanes's Peace. Using pulleys and mirrors, Dee created the illusion of "the Scarabeus flying up to Jupiter's palace" in a mechanical contrivance, possibly based on rediscovered classical techniques. Dee would later claim this to be the source of his reputation as a magician. In the late 1540s and early 1550s, he travelled around Europe, studying at the Old University of Leuven (1548). He studied under Gemma Frisius and became friends with the cartographers Gerardus Mercator and Abraham Ortelius. Dee also met, worked with and learnt from other continental mathematicians, such as Federico Commandino in Italy. He returned to England with a major collection of mathematical and astronomical instruments. In 1552, he met Gerolamo Cardano in London, with whom he investigated a purported perpetual motion machine and a gem supposed to have magical properties.

=== Working life ===
Rector at Upton-upon-Severn from 1553, Dee was offered a readership in mathematics at Oxford University in 1554 but declined it, citing as offensive English universities' emphasis on rhetoric and grammar (which, together with logic, formed the academic trivium) over philosophy and science (the more advanced quadrivium, composed of arithmetic, geometry, music and astronomy). He was busy with writing and perhaps hoped for a better position at court. On 17 February 1554, Dee took Catholic orders in the midst of the Marian reaction. The Catholic bishop Edmund Bonner, likely already a close friend of Dee's at this point, gave him special permission to receive all of the holy orders from first tonsure to priesthood in only a single day.

In 1555, Dee joined the Worshipful Company of Mercers, as his father had, through its system of patrimony. In that same year, Dee was arrested and charged with "lewd and vain practices of calculating and conjuring" because he had cast horoscopes of Mary I of England and Princess Elizabeth. The charges were raised to treason against Mary. Dee appeared in the Star Chamber and exonerated himself, but he was turned over to Bonner for religious examination. His strong, lifelong penchant for secrecy may have worsened matters. The episode was the most dramatic in a series of attacks and slanders that dogged Dee throughout his life. At some point, possibly before his charges were officially dismissed, Dee became Bonner's chaplain. In some early editions of John Foxe's Acts and Monuments, Dee, as Bonner's chaplain, is recorded debating the real presence of Christ in the Eucharist with Protestant prisoner Robert Smith (who accused Dee of Marcionism because his argument in favor of transubstantiation rested on the idea that Jesus possessed only a spiritual body) and participating in the seventh examination of John Philpot.

Dee presented Queen Mary in 1556 with a visionary plan to preserve old books, manuscripts, and records and to found a national library, but it was not taken up. Instead, he expanded his personal library in Mortlake, acquiring books and manuscripts in England and on the Continent. Dee's library, a centre of learning outside the universities, became the greatest in England and attracted many scholars.

Dee's glyph, whose meaning he explained in Monas Hieroglyphica

When Elizabeth succeeded to the throne in 1558, Dee became her astrological and scientific advisor. He chose her coronation date and even became a Protestant. From the 1550s to the 1570s, he served as an advisor to England's voyages of discovery, providing technical aid in navigation and political support to create a "British Empire", a term he was the first to use. Dee wrote in October 1574 to William Cecil, 1st Baron Burghley, seeking patronage. He said he had occult knowledge of treasure in the Welsh Marches and of valuable manuscripts kept at Wigmore Castle, knowing that the Lord Treasurer's ancestors came from the area.

In 1564, Dee wrote the Hermetic work Monas Hieroglyphica (The Hieroglyphic Monad), an exhaustive Christian Kabbalistic interpretation of a glyph of his own design, meant to express the mystical unity of all creation. Having dedicated it to Maximilian II, Holy Roman Emperor, in an effort to gain patronage, Dee attempted to present it to him at the time of his ascension to the throne of Hungary. The work was esteemed by many of Dee's contemporaries, and the royal secret service valued its treatise on cryptography, but it cannot be fully understood today in the absence of the secret oral tradition of that era.

His 1570 "Mathematical Preface" to Henry Billingsley's English translation of Euclid's Elements argued for the importance of mathematics as an influence on the other arts and sciences. Intended for an audience outside the universities, it proved to be Dee's most widely influential and frequently reprinted work.

In 1577, Dee published General and Rare Memorials pertayning to the Perfect Arte of Navigation, a work setting out his vision of a maritime empire and asserting English territorial claims on the New World. Dee was acquainted with Humphrey Gilbert and close to Philip Sidney and his circle.

=== Later life ===
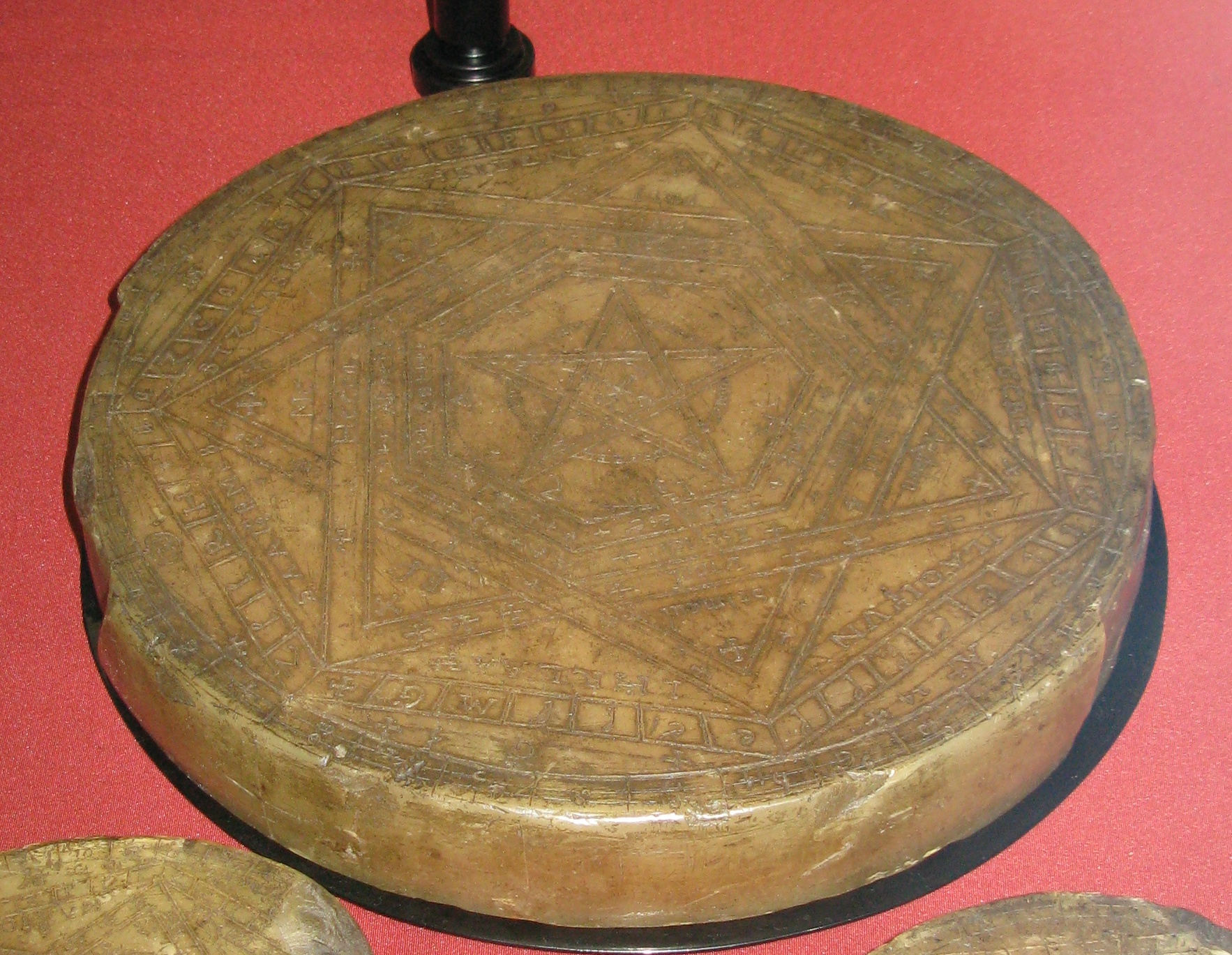
The "Seal of God", British Museum

By the early 1580s, Dee was discontented with his progress in learning the secrets of nature and his diminishing influence and recognition in court circles. Failure of his ideas concerning a proposed calendar revision, the colonial establishment, and the ambivalent results of voyages of exploration in North America had nearly brought his hopes of political patronage to an end. He subsequently began to turn energetically towards the supernatural as a means of acquiring knowledge. He sought to contact spirits through scrying, which he thought would act as an intermediary between himself and the angels.

Dee's first attempts with scryers were unsatisfactory, but in 1582, he met Edward Kelley (then calling himself Edward Talbot), who impressed him greatly with his abilities. Dee took Kelley into his service and began to devote all his energies to his supernatural pursuits. These "spiritual conferences" or "actions" were conducted with intense Christian piety, always after periods of purification, prayer and fasting. Dee was convinced of the benefits they could bring to humankind. The character of Kelley is harder to assess: some conclude that he acted with cynicism, but delusion or self-deception cannot be ruled out. Kelley's 'output' is remarkable for its volume, intricacy and vividness. Dee records in his journals that angels dictated several books to him this way, through Kelley, some in a special angelic or Enochian language.

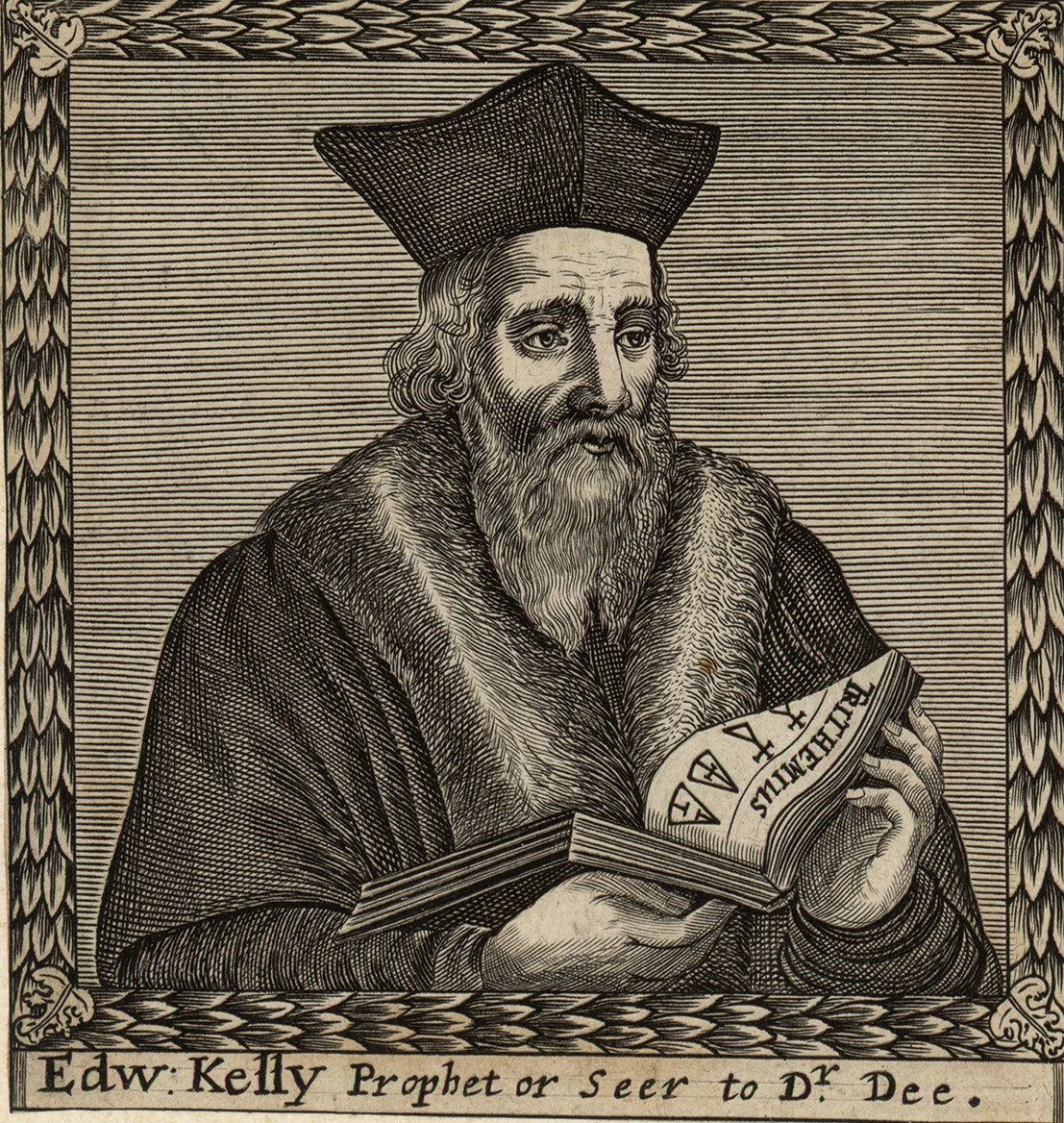
Edward Kelley

In 1583, Dee met the impoverished yet popular Polish nobleman Albert Łaski, who, after overstaying his welcome at court, invited Dee to accompany him back to Poland. With some prompting by the "angels" (again through Kelley) and by dint of his worsening status at court, Dee decided to do so. He, Kelley, and their families left in September 1583, but Łaski proved to be bankrupt and out of favour in his own country. Dee and Kelley began a nomadic life in Central Europe, meanwhile continuing their spiritual conferences, which Dee detailed in his diaries and almanacs. They had audiences with Emperor Rudolf II in Prague Castle and King Stephen Báthory of Poland, whom they attempted to convince of the importance of angelic communication. The Báthory meeting took place at the Niepołomice Castle (near Kraków, then capital of Poland) and was later analysed by Polish historians (Ryszard Zieliński, Roman Żelewski, Roman Bugaj) and writers (Waldemar Łysiak). While Dee was generally seen as a man of deep knowledge, he was mistrusted for his connection with the English monarch, Elizabeth I, for whom some thought Dee was a spy. Dee did indeed pen a covert letter to spymaster Francis Walsingham in which he said "I am forced to be brief ... That which England suspected was also here". The Polish king, a devout Catholic and cautious of supernatural mediators, began their meeting(s) by affirming that prophetic revelations must match the teachings of Jesus, the mission of the Catholic Church, and the approval of the sitting pope.

In 1587, at a spiritual conference in the Kingdom of Bohemia, Kelley told Dee that the angel Uriel had ordered the men to share all their possessions, including their wives. By this time, Kelley had gained some renown as an alchemist and was more sought after than Dee in this regard: it was a line of work with prospects for serious, long-term financial gain, especially among the royal families of central Europe. Dee, however, was more interested in communicating with angels, who he believed would help him solve the mysteries of the heavens through mathematics, optics, astrology, science, and navigation. Perhaps Kelley, in fact, wished to end Dee's dependence on him as a diviner during their increasingly lengthy, frequent spiritual conferences. The order for wife-sharing caused Dee anguish, but he apparently did not doubt it was genuine, and they apparently shared wives. However, Dee broke off the conferences immediately afterwards. He returned to England in 1589, while Kelley went on to be the alchemist to Emperor Rudolf II. Nine months later, on 28 February 1588, a son was born to Dee's wife, whom Dee baptised Theodorus Trebonianus Dee and raised as his own.

=== Final years ===
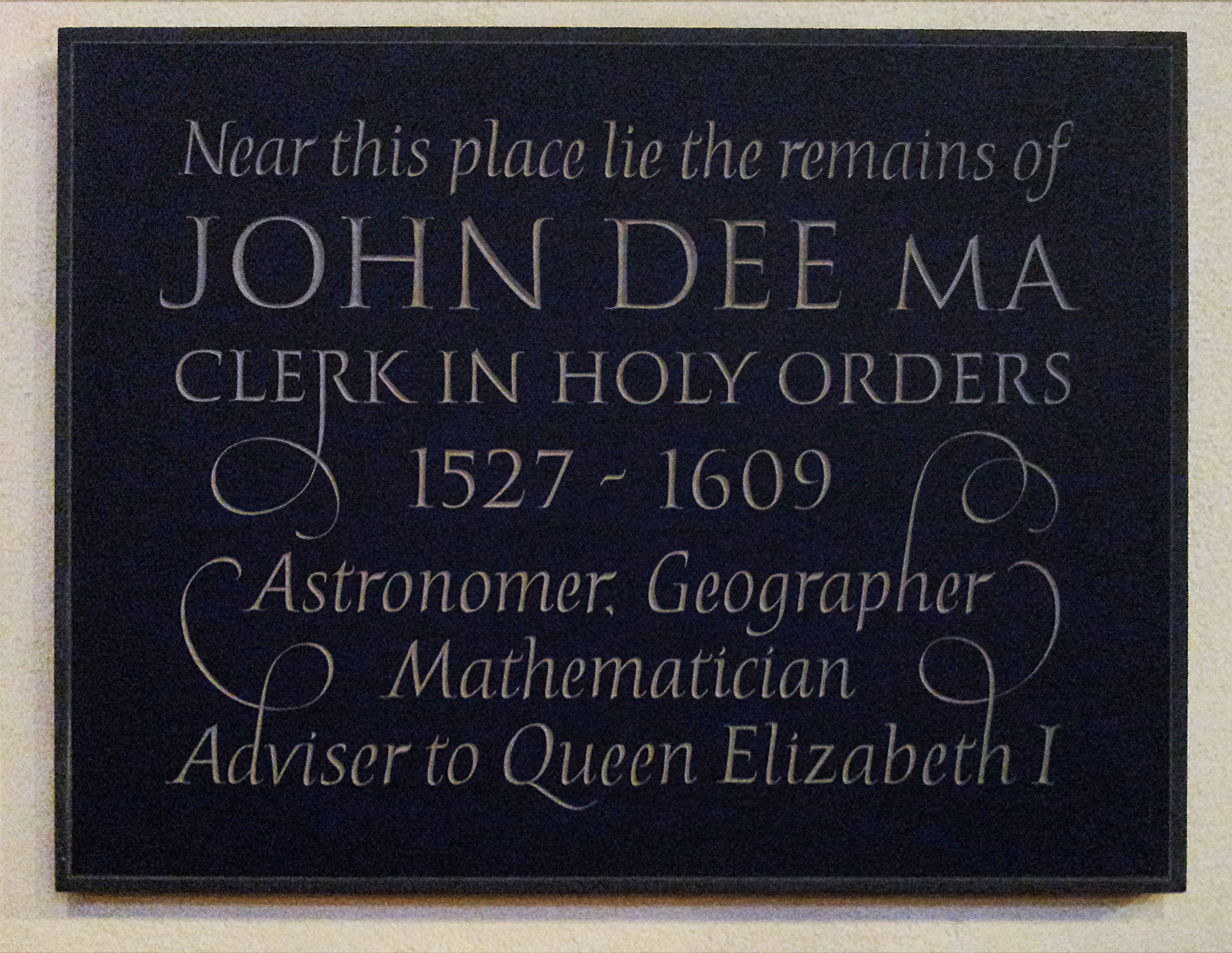
John Dee memorial plaque installed in 2013 inside the church of St Mary the Virgin, Mortlake

Dee returned to Mortlake after six years abroad to find his home vandalised, his library ruined, and many of his prized books and instruments stolen. Furthermore, he found that increasing criticism of occult practices had made England still less hospitable to his magical practices and natural philosophy. He sought support from Elizabeth, who hoped he could persuade Kelley to return and ease England's economic burdens through alchemy. (Note: "Although it is indeed probable that Kelly was more accomplished and also more devoted to pursuing the way of transmuting base metals to gold, his master approached alchemy in a more subtle and complex way. He did not stand next to the furnace and the alembic day and night, but in his diaries he documented his practical experiments."(Szönyi 2015, pp. 100–130)) She finally appointed Dee the warden of Christ's College, Manchester, in 1595.

This former College of Priests had been re-established as a Protestant institution by royal charter in 1578. However, he could not exert much control over its fellows, who despised or cheated him. Early in his tenure, he was consulted on the demonic possession of seven children; he took little interest in the case but allowed those involved to consult his still-extensive library.

Dee left Manchester in 1605 to return to London, but remained warden until his death. By that time, Elizabeth was dead and James I gave him no support. Dee spent his final years in poverty at Mortlake, forced to sell various possessions to support himself and his daughter, Katherine, who cared for him until his death there late in 1608 or early in 1609, aged 81. His precise date of death is unknown, as both the parish registers and Dee's gravestone are missing. In 2013, a memorial plaque to Dee was placed on the south wall of the present church.

== Personal life ==
Dee "promoted English overseas exploration and expansion in terms of a political and spiritual renewal at home".

Dee was married three times and had eight children. He married his first wife, Katherine Constable, in 1565. They had no children, and she died in 1574. He married his second wife, whose name is unknown, in 1575. She died in 1576, again with no children.

In 1578, when he was 51, he married the 23-year-old Jane Fromond (1555–1604), who had her own connection with the Elizabethan court as a lady-in-waiting to Elizabeth FitzGerald, Countess of Lincoln, until she married Dee. They had 7 or 8 children, namely: Arthur Dee (1579–1651), Michael Dee (died 1594), Rowland Dee, Katherine Dee, Madinia/Madima Dee, Frances Dee, Margaret Dee, and possibly Theodore Dee (1588–1601).

Dee referred to Thomas Jones, who is the likely loose inspiration for Welsh folkloric outlaw Twm Siôn Cati, as his cousin; the pair corresponded, and Jones visited Dee several times.

From 1577 to 1601, Dee kept a sporadic diary (also referred to as his almanac), from which most of what we know of his life in that time has been gleaned. In 1587, Kelley informed Dee of the angel's wish that they share wives. Theodore Dee, born nine months later, could have been fathered by Kelley, and not Dee.

Jane died in Manchester of bubonic plague and was buried in the Manchester Cathedral burial grounds in March 1604. Michael, born in Prague, died on his father's birthday in 1594. Theodore, born in Třeboň, died in Manchester in 1601. His sons Arthur and Rowland survived him, as did his daughter Katherine, "his companion to the end". No records exist for his youngest daughters Madinia (sometimes spelled Madima), Frances and Margaret after 1604, so it is widely assumed they died in the epidemic that took their mother (as Dee had by this time ceased to keep a diary).

While Arthur was a student at the Westminster School, Dee wrote to his headmaster, echoing the normal worries of boarding-school parents. Arthur was an apprentice in much of his father's alchemical and scientific work and, in fact, often his diviner until Kelley appeared. He went on to become an alchemist and Hermetic author, whose works were published by Elias Ashmole.

The antiquary John Aubrey (Note: Aubrey's great-grandfather William Aubrey was a cousin "and intimate acquaintance" of Dee.) describes Dee as "tall and slender. He wore a gown like an artist's gown, with hanging sleeves, and a slit ... A very fair, clear sanguine complexion ... a long beard as white as milk. A very handsome man."

== Achievements ==
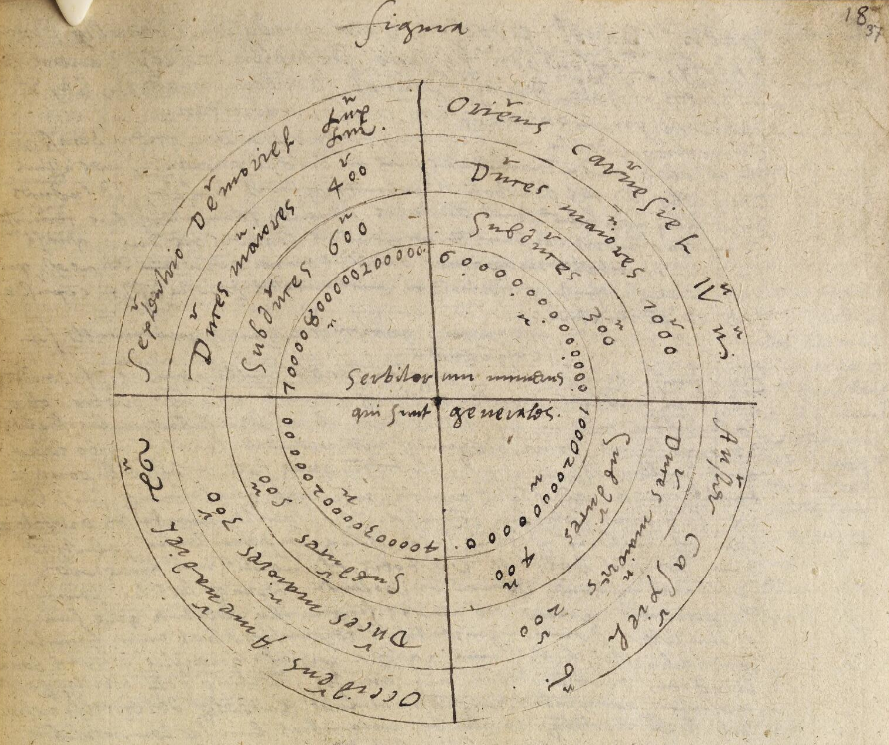
A chart from Johannes Trithemius's Steganographia in the hand of John Dee who copied the entire manuscript in 1591

Dee was a devout Christian, with his religiosity influenced by doctrines from Hermetic, Platonic, and Pythagorean systems, which were pervasive in the Renaissance. He believed that numbers were the basis of all things and key to knowledge. From Hermeticism he drew a belief that man had the potential for divine power that could be exercised through mathematics. His goal was to help bring forth a unified world religion through the healing of the breach of the Roman Catholic and Protestant churches and the recapture of the pure theology of the ancients.

=== Advocating the establishment of colonies ===
From 1570 Dee advocated a policy of political and economic strengthening of England and establishment of colonies in the New World. His manuscript Brytannicae reipublicae synopsis (1570) outlined the state of the Elizabethan Realm and was concerned with trade, ethics and national strength.

His 1576 General and Rare Memorials pertayning to the Perfect Arte of Navigation was the first volume in an unfinished series planned to advocate for the establishment of English colonies abroad. In a symbolic frontispiece, Dee included a figure of Britannia kneeling by the shore beseeching Elizabeth I to protect her nation by strengthening her navy. Dee used Geoffrey's inclusion of Ireland in King Arthur's conquests to argue that Arthur had established a "British empire" abroad. He argued that the establishment of new colonies would benefit England economically, with said colonies being protected by a strong navy. Dee has been credited with coining the term British Empire, but Humphrey Llwyd has also been credited with the first use in his Commentarioli Britannicae Descriptionis Fragmentum, published eight years earlier in 1568.

Dee posited a formal claim to North America on the back of a map drawn in 1577–1580; he noted that "circa 1494 Mr. Robert Thorn his father, and Mr. Eliot of Bristow, discovered Newfound Land." In his Title Royal of 1580, he wrote that Madog ab Owain Gwynedd had discovered America, intending thereby to boost England's claim to the New World over that of Spain's. He also asserted that Brutus of Britain and King Arthur, as well as Madog, had conquered lands in the Americas, so that their heir, Elizabeth I of England, had a prior claim there.

== Reputation and significance ==
Some ten years after Dee's death, the antiquarian Sir Robert Cotton, 1st Baronet, of Connington bought land around Dee's house and began digging for papers and artifacts. He found several manuscripts, mainly records of Dee's angelic communications. Cotton's son gave these to the scholar Méric Casaubon, who published them in 1659, with a long introduction critical of their author, as A True & Faithful Relation of What passed for many Yeers between Dr. John Dee (A Mathematician of Great Fame in Q. Eliz. and King James their Reignes) and some spirits. As the first public revelation of Dee's spiritual conferences, the book was popular. Casaubon, who believed in the reality of spirits, argued in his introduction that Dee was acting as the unwitting tool of evil spirits while believing he was communicating with angels. This book is mainly responsible for the image, prevalent for the next two-and-a-half centuries, of Dee as a dupe and deluded fanatic.

About the time the True and Faithful Relation was published, members of the Rosicrucian movement claimed Dee as one of their number. There is doubt, however, that an organized Rosicrucian movement existed in Dee's lifetime, and no evidence that he ever belonged to any secret fraternity. His reputation as a magician and the vivid story of his association with Edward Kelley have made him a seemingly irresistible figure to fabulists, writers of horror stories, and latter-day magicians. The accretion of fanciful information about Dee often obscures the facts of his life, remarkable as they were. It also does nothing to promote his Christian leanings: Dee looked to the angels to tell him how he might heal the deep and serious rifts between the Roman Catholic Church, the Church of England, and the Protestant movement in England. Queen Elizabeth I used him several times as her court astronomer, not solely because he practised Hermetic arts, but as a deeply religious and learned trustworthy man.

A revaluation of Dee's character and significance came in the 20th century, largely through the work of the historians Charlotte Fell Smith and Frances Yates. Both brought into focus the parallel roles of magic, science, and religion in the Elizabethan Renaissance. Fell Smith writes: "There is perhaps no learned author in history who has been so persistently misjudged, nay, even slandered, by his posterity, and not a voice in all the three centuries uplifted even to claim for him a fair hearing. Surely it is time that the cause of all this universal condemnation should be examined in the light of reason and science; and perhaps it will be found to exist mainly in the fact that he was too far advanced in speculative thought for his own age to understand." Through this and subsequent re-evaluation, Dee is now viewed as a serious scholar and book collector, a devoted Christian (albeit at a confusing time for that faith), an able scientist, and one of the most learned men of his day. His Mortlake library was the largest in the country before it was vandalised, and created at enormous, sometimes ruinous personal expense; it was seen as one of the finest in Europe, perhaps second only to that of Jacques Auguste de Thou. As well as being an astrological and scientific advisor to Elizabeth and her court, he was an early advocate of colonisation of North America, envisioning a British Empire stretching across the North Atlantic.

Dee promoted the sciences of navigation and cartography. He studied closely with Gerardus Mercator and owned an important collection of maps, globes, and astronomical instruments. He developed new instruments and special navigational techniques for use in polar regions. Dee served as an advisor to English voyages of discovery, and personally selected pilots and trained them in navigation. He believed that mathematics (which he understood mystically) was central to human learning. The centrality of mathematics to Dee's vision makes him to that extent more modern than Francis Bacon, though some scholars believe Bacon purposely downplayed mathematics in the anti-occult atmosphere of the reign of James I. Although Dee's understanding of the role of mathematics differs much from ours, its promotion outside the universities was an enduring achievement. For most of his writings, Dee chose English, rather than Latin, to make them accessible to the public. His "Mathematical Preface" to Euclid was meant to promote the study and application of mathematics by those without a university education, and was popular and influential among the "mechanicians": a growing class of technical craftsmen and artisans. Dee's preface includes demonstrations of mathematical principles that readers could perform themselves without special education or training.

In the 20th century, the Municipal Borough of Richmond (now the London Borough of Richmond upon Thames) honoured John Dee by naming a street near Mortlake "Dee Road".

=== Calendar ===
Dee was a friend of Tycho Brahe and familiar with the work (translated into English by his ward and assistant, Thomas Digges) of Nicolaus Copernicus. Many of his astronomical calculations were based on Copernican assumptions, although he never openly espoused the heliocentric theory. Dee applied Copernican theory to the problem of calendar reform. In 1583, he was asked to advise the queen on the new Gregorian calendar promulgated by Pope Gregory XIII from October 1582. He advised that England accept it, albeit with seven specific amendments. The first was that the adjustment should not be the ten days that would restore the calendar to the time of the First Council of Nicaea in 325, but rather eleven days, which would restore it to the birth of Jesus. Another proposal of Dee's was to align the civil and liturgical years and have them both start on 1 January. Perhaps predictably, England chose to spurn suggestions of papist origin, despite any merit they may have had.

=== Voynich manuscript ===
Dee has often been associated with the Voynich manuscript. Wilfrid Michael Voynich, who bought the manuscript in 1912, suggested that Dee may have owned it and sold it to Rudolph II. Dee's contacts with Rudolph were less extensive than had been thought, however, and Dee's diaries show no evidence of a sale. However, he was known to have owned a copy of the Book of Soyga, another enciphered book.

=== Artefacts ===
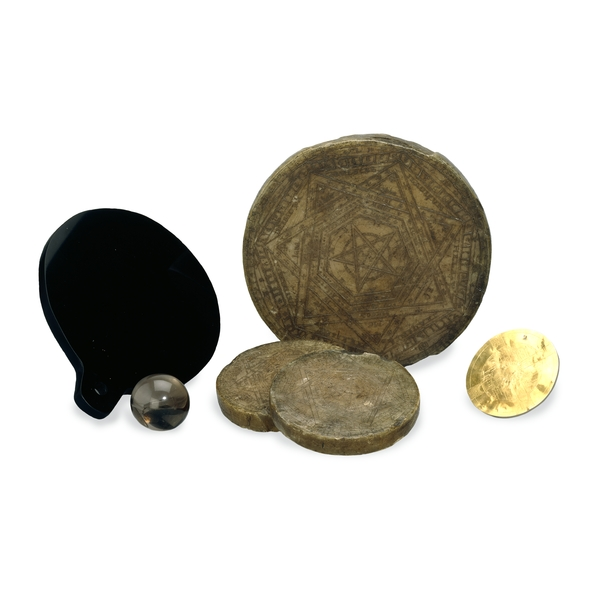
Objects used by Dee in his magic, now in the British Museum

The British Museum holds several items once allegedly owned by Dee and associated with the spiritual conferences:

- Dee's Speculum or Mirror (an obsidian Aztec cult object in the shape of a hand-mirror, brought to Europe in the late 1520s), which was subsequently owned by Horace Walpole. This was first attributed to Dee by Walpole. Lord Frederick Campbell had brought "a round piece of shining black marble in a leathern case" to Walpole in an attempt to ascertain its provenance. Walpole said he responded, saying, "Oh, Lord, I am the only man in England that can tell you! It is Dr. Dee's black stone." However, there is no explicit reference to the mirror in any of Dee's surviving writings.
- The small wax seals used to support the legs of Dee's "table of practice" (the table at which the scrying was performed)
- The large, elaborately decorated wax "Seal of God", used to support the "shew-stone", the crystal ball used for scrying
- A gold amulet engraved with a representation of one of Kelley's visions
- A crystal globe, 6 cm in diameter. This item remained unnoticed for many years in the mineral collection; it is possibly the one owned by Dee, but the provenance is less certain than for the others.

In December 2004, both a shew stone (used for divining) formerly belonging to Dee and a mid-17th-century explanation of its use written by Nicholas Culpeper were stolen from the Science Museum in London, but recovered shortly afterwards.

=== Science and sorcery ===
To 21st-century eyes, Dee's activities straddle magic and modern science, but to apply a hard and fast distinction between these two realms or epistemological world views is anachronistic. He was invited to lecture on Euclidean geometry at the University of Paris while still in his early twenties. He was an ardent promoter of mathematics, a respected astronomer and a leading expert in navigation, who trained many who would conduct England's voyages of discovery.

Meanwhile, he immersed himself in sorcery, astrology, and Hermetic philosophy. Much effort in his last 30 years went into trying to commune with angels, so as to learn the universal language of creation and achieve a pre-apocalyptic unity of humankind. A student of the Renaissance Neo-Platonism of Marsilio Ficino, he drew no distinctions between his mathematical research and his investigations of Hermetic magic, angel summoning and divination: all his activities were part of his quest for a transcendent understanding of divine forms underlying the visible world: Dee's "pure verities".

Dee amassed one of England's biggest libraries. His scholarly status also took him into Elizabethan politics as an adviser and tutor to Elizabeth I and through relations with her ministers Francis Walsingham and William Cecil, 1st Baron Burghley. He tutored and patronised Sir Philip Sidney; his uncle Robert Dudley, 1st Earl of Leicester; Edward Dyer; and Sir Christopher Hatton.

== Literary and cultural references ==
Dee was a popular figure in literary works by his contemporaries and he has continued to feature in popular culture, particularly in fiction or fantasy set during his lifetime or dealing with magic or the occult.

=== 16th and 17th centuries ===
Edmund Spenser may be referring to Dee in The Faerie Queene (1596). William Shakespeare may have modelled the character of Prospero in The Tempest (1610–1611) on Dee.

=== 19th century ===
Dee is the subject of Henry Gillard Glindoni's painting John Dee Performing an Experiment Before Queen Elizabeth I.

=== 20th century ===
Dee is a major character in John Crowley's four-volume novel Ægypt, the first volume of which, The Solitudes, was published in 1987.

Donald McCormick claimed Dee was Ian Fleming's inspiration for his James Bond character. He also claimed that the "007" moniker originated as a symbol used by Dee. Although there is evidence that Fleming read a memoir of Dee's about the time that he created the Bond character, scholar Teresa Burns has cast doubt on the claim that "007" originates from any symbol used by Dee.

Dee is portrayed as a magician in Derek Jarman's film Jubilee, who transports Queen Elizabeth I from the 16th century to the 20th.

Dee is a central character in Peter Ackroyd's 1993 novel The House of Doctor Dee.

Dee (and his descendant) is the main character in Gustav Meyrink's 1927 novel The Angel of the West Window

=== 21st century ===
John Dee is one of the main antagonists in the book series The Secrets of the Immortal Nicholas Flamel by Michael Scott. In the series, John Dee has gained immortality from the Dark Elders, his mentors.

Phil Rickman casts Dee as the main detective, investigating the disappearance of the bones of King Arthur during the reign of Elizabeth I in the historical mystery The Bones of Avalon (2010). The play Burn Your Bookes (2010) by Richard Byrne examines the relations between Dee, Edward Kelley and Edward Dyer.

The opera Dr Dee: An English Opera (2011) by Damon Albarn, explores Dee's life and work.

John Zorn's string quartet The Alchemist (2014) was inspired by the alchemical work of Dee and Kelley.

The Iron Maiden song "The Alchemist" from the album The Final Frontier (2010) is written about John Dee.

== Works ==
- Monas Hieroglyphica, 1564
- Preface to Billingsley's Euclid (Billingsley's translation of Euclid's Elements), 1570
- General and Rare Memorials, Pertayning to the Perfect Art of Navigation: Annexed to the Paradoxal Cumpas in Playze. 1577.
- On the Mystical Rule of the Seven Planets, 1582–1583
- Dee, John; Kelly, Edward; Casaubon, Meric (1659). A True & Faithful Relation of what Passed for Many Yeers Between Dr. John Dee and Some Spirits. T Garthwait. ISBN 978-5-88514-094-2.
- Quinti Libri Mysteriorum. British Library, Sloane MS 3188. Also available in a fair copy by Elias Ashmole, at Sloane MS 3677.
- Joseph H. Peterson, ed. (2003). John Dee's Five Books of Mystery: Original Sourcebook of Enochian Magic. Boston: Weiser Books. ISBN 978-1-57863-178-0. from the collected works known as Mysteriorum libri quinque
- John Dee, The Mathematicall Praeface to the Elements of Geometrie of Euclid of Megara (1570). (Reprinted New York: Science History Publications (1975) ISBN 0-88202-020-X)
- John Dee, John Dee on Astronomy: Propaedeumata Aphoristica (1558 & 1568) edited by Wayne Shumaker, Berkeley: University of California Press ISBN 0-520-03376-0
- John Dee, Autobiographical tracts of John Dee, Warden of the College of Manchester, ed. James Crossley. Chetham Society Publications, Vol XXIV. Manchester, 1851
- John Dee, Diary for the years 1595–1601, ed. John E. Bailey. Privately printed, 1880
- J.O. Halliwell, ed. (1842). The Private Diary of Dr John Dee. Camden Society.

== See also ==
- Calendar (New Style) Act 1750 – British statute adopting the Gregorian calendar
- Heliocentric astrology – Form of astrology based on the heliocentric model
