= Kef =

Kef may refer to:

== Places ==
- El Kef (also transliterated as Al-Kāf or Le Kef), a city in northwestern Tunisia
- Kef Governorate, Tunisia

== Others ==
- Aram Bajakian's Kef, a 2011 album by guitarist Aram Bajakian
- ISO 639:kef or Ewe language of southeastern Ghana
- Kef Kalesi, a castle near Adilcevaz, Turkey
- A letter in a fictional alphabet in John Norman's Gor novels
- Keflavík International Airport

== See also ==
- KEF (disambiguation)
- Kief, a form of cannabis
