= Fragmentations, Prayers and Interjections =

Live album by John Zorn
- Released: March 18, 2014
- Recorded: September 25, 2013
- Venue: Miller Theatre, NYC
- Genre: Avant-garde, contemporary classical music
- Length: 46:17
- Label: Tzadik TZ 8315
- Producer: John Zorn

John Zorn chronology
The Alchemist (2014)	Fragmentations, Prayers and Interjections (2014)	Alastor: Book of Angels Volume 21 (2014)

Fragmentations, Prayers and Interjections is an album composed by John Zorn and featuring the Arcana Orchestra which was recorded in New York City in 2013 and released on the Tzadik label in March 2014. The album was recorded at Columbia University's Miller Theatre as part of the Zorn@60 Celebrations. The piece Kol Nidre is a tune from Zorn's Masada songbook.

== Reception ==
Professional ratings
Review scores
Source	Rating
PopMatters	7/10 stars

PopMatters reviewer Alex Franquelli stated "Fragmentations, Prayers & Interjections is an amazing collection of ideas, rather than an album per se. Its lack of consistency undeniably constitutes an asset, rather than a disadvantage, as is often the case with the music written by one of the most prolific tunesmiths of our era. Zorn proves that he has yet to explore the numerous opportunities given by orchestral arrangements, and that the time is probably right for him to start developing a new path in his career".

== Track listing ==
All compositions by John Zorn.

1. "Orchestra Variations" - 5:20
2. "Contes de Fées" - 12:30
3. "Kol Nidre" - 8:12
4. "Suppôts et Suppliciations" - 20:12

== Personnel ==
=== Arcana Orchestra ===
- Barry Crawford, Claire Chase, Sooyun Kim, Tara Helen O'Connor - piccolo, flute, alto flute, bass flute
- Arthur Sato, Christa Robinson, Jeffrey Reinhardt, Scott Bartucca - oboe, English horn
- Alicia Lee, Campbell MacDonald, Carol McGonnell, Joshua Rubin, Rane Moore - clarinet, bass clarinet
- Adrian Morejon, Brad Balliett, Natalie Pilla, Rebekah Heller - bassoon, contrabassoon
- David Peel, Jon Carroll, Kate Sheeran, Rachel Drehmann - French horn
- Gareth Flowers, Nathan Botts, Peter Evans, Wayne Dumaine - trumpet
- Dave Nelson, Kenn Finn, Sam Armstrong - trombone
- Dave Taylor - bass trombone
- Dan Peck - tuba
- Alex Lipowski, Matthew Gold, Michael Truesdell, William Winant - percussion
- Adda Kridler, Ari Streisfeld, Arthur Moeller, Asmira Woodward-Page, Brendan Speltz, Caroline Chin, Christopher Otto, Clara Lyon, Conrad Harris, Elizabeth Derham, Emilie-Anne Gendron, Erik Carlson, Esther Noh, Jennifer Choi, Joshua Modney, Joyce Hammann, Kathryn Andersen, Ken Hamao, Nicole Jeong, Olivia De Prato, Owen Dalby, Pauline Kim, Tom Chiu, William Knuth, Yon Joo Lee, Yuki Numata Resnick - violin
- Ah Ling Neu, David Wallace, Denise Stillwell, Gillian Gallagher, Jen Herman, Jocelin Pan, John Pickford Richards, Stephanie Griffin, Victor Lowrie, William Hakim - viola
- Christopher Gross, Erik Friedlander, Felix Fan, Fred Sherry, Jay Campbell, Jeffrey Zeigler, Kevin McFarland, Mariel Roberts, Meghan Burke, Michael Nicolas - cello
- Andrew Roitstein, Brian Ellingsen, Doug Balliett, Kris Saebo, Randall Zigler, Zachary Hobin - bass
- Bridget Kibbey - harp
- Steven Beck - piano, harpsichord, celeste, organ
- David Fulmer - conductor

=== Production ===
- Silas Brown - engineer, audio mixer
- John Zorn and Kazunori Sugiyama – producers
