= Aram Bajakian =

American guitarist of Armenian descent

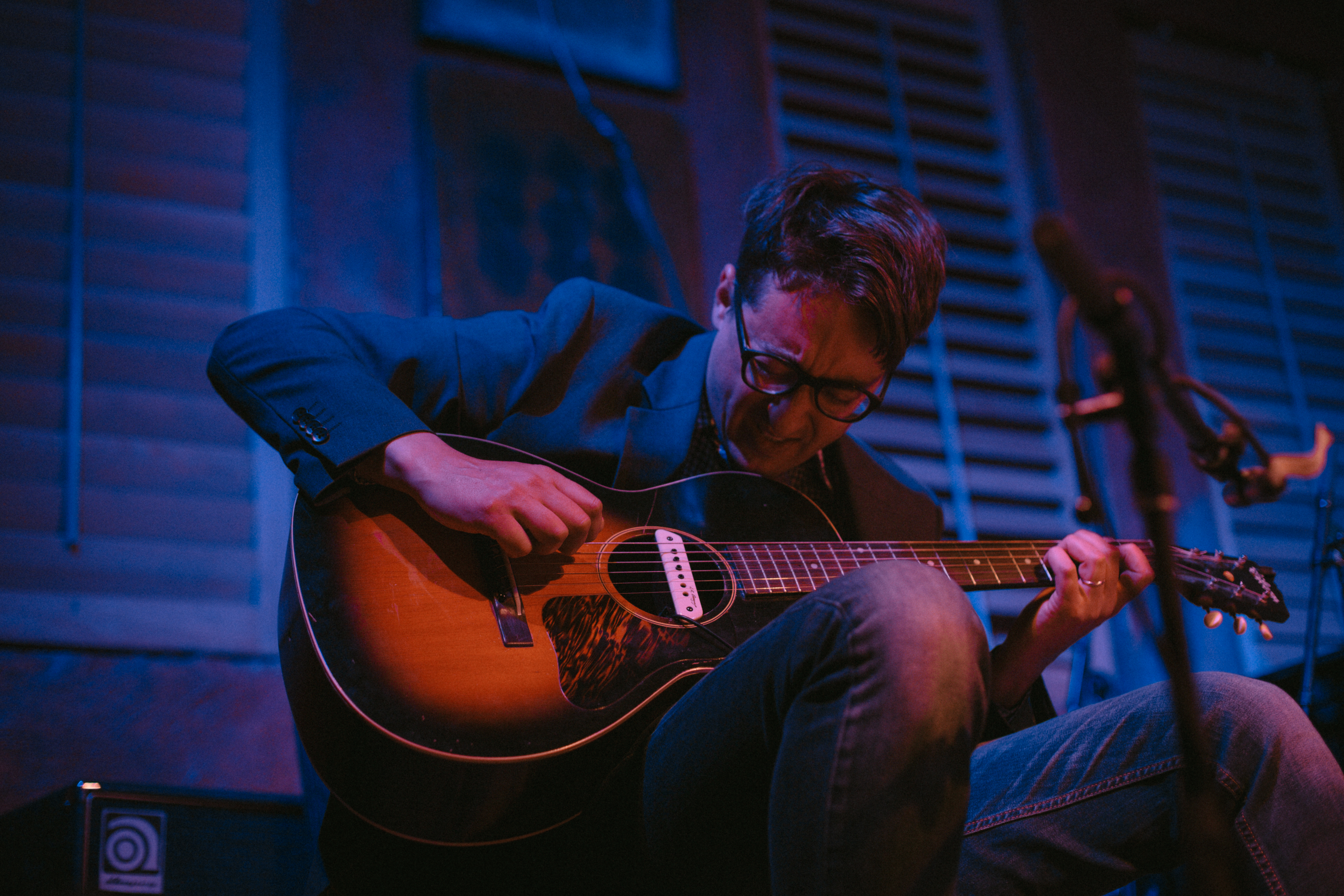
- Aram Bajakian at the 2017 Vancouver Jazz Festival

Background information
- Born: 1977 (age 48–49)
- Genres: Jazz
- Occupation: Musician
- Instrument: Guitar
- Website: mynameisaram.net

Aram Bajakian (born 1977) is an American guitarist of Armenian descent who has recorded and toured with John Zorn, Lou Reed, Diana Krall, and with Madeleine Peyroux in 2018.

== Career ==
Bajakian received a Bachelor of Music degree from the University of Massachusetts Amherst, where he studied under Yusef Lateef, a master's degree in Music Education from Teachers College, Columbia University, and a Master of Music degree in Music Composition from the University of British Columbia, where he studied electronic music under Keith Hamel. Marc Ribot introduced Bajakian to John Zorn, who released Bajakian's first album on Tzadik Records. Bajakian moved with his family to Vancouver in 2013 so that his wife could pursue a degree in ethnomusicology at the University of British Columbia.

== Discography ==
=== As leader ===
- Aram Bajakian's Kef (Tzadik, 2011)
- There Were Flowers Also in Hell (Sanasar, 2014)
- Dálava (Sanasar, 2014)
- There's Always the Night with Pavees Dance (Noonansmusic, 2014)
- Music Inspired by the Color of Pomegranates (Sanasar, 2015)
- Dolphy Formations (Sanasar, 2017)
- Dálava: The Book of Transfigurations (Songlines, 2017)
- Carillon: Sounds From A Dislocated Piano (Sanasar, 2025)
- Julia Úlehla & Dálava: Understories (Pi Recordings, 2025)

=== As sideman ===
- Sean Noonan's Being Brewed by Noon: Live from New York and beyond (Innova 2008)
- Shanir Ezra Blumenkranz, Abraxas: Book of Angels Volume 19 (Tzadik, 2012)
- Frank London, Austro Hungarian Jewish Music (Piranha, 2017)
- Jon Madof, Zion80 (Tzadik, 2013)
- John Zorn, Psychomagia (Tzadik, 2014)
- John Zorn, Masada Book 3: The Book Beri'ah (Tzadik, 2018)
