= Arthur Dee =

English physician and alchemist (1579–1651)

Arthur Dee (13 July 1579 – September or October 1651) was a physician and alchemist. He became a physician successively to Tsar Michael I of Russia and to King Charles I of England.

== Youth ==
Dee was the eldest son of John Dee by his third wife, Jane, daughter of Bartholomew Fromond of East Cheam, Surrey. He was born at Mortlake on 13 July 1579. As a child he accompanied his father on travels through Germany, Poland and Bohemia. After his return to England he was placed at Westminster School, on 3 May 1592, under the tuition of Edward Grant and William Camden. Anthony Wood was informed that he subsequently studied at Oxford, but he took no degree and it is not known which college he attended.

== Medicine ==
Settling in London with the intention of practising "physic" (medicine), he exhibited at the door of his house a list of medicines which were said to be certain cures for many diseases. The censors of the College of Physicians summoned him to appear before them, but it is not known what the outcome was. Proceeding to Manchester, Dee married Isabella, daughter of Edward Prestwych, a justice of the peace.

Through the recommendation of James I Dee was appointed one of the physicians to the Tsar Michael I of Russia. He remained in Russia for about 14 years, principally in Moscow. There he wrote his Fasciculus Chemicus, a collection of writings on alchemy.

Returning to England on the death of his wife in 1637, Dee became physician to King Charles I. On his retirement, Arthur Dee moved to Norwich, where he became a friend of Sir Thomas Browne. His relationship to Browne has been little explored, one literary critic speculating on it:

Little is known of this son of Dee's; one cannot help but wonder however, how much he may have influenced Browne, who was one of the seventeenth century's greatest literary exponents of the type of occult philosophy in which both the Dee's were immersed.

== The philosopher's stone ==
In 2018, Megan Piorko, a PhD student at Georgia State University, discovered a coded text in one of Dee's alchemical notebooks purporting to contain a recipe for the so-called philosopher's stone, a mythical elixir of life capable of changing base metals into gold or silver and of imparting immortality. Piorko and digital humanities scholar Sarah Lang published the full text in September 2021. It was deciphered later that year by the mathematician and cryptologist Richard Bean of the University of Queensland.

The decoded text describes the processing of an alchemical "egg" in an athanor, a slow-burning furnace popular with alchemists. Then there must be a wait for the three universal alchemical phases to occur: black, white, and red. If all steps are followed correctly, "you will have a truly gold-making elixir by whose benevolence all the misery of poverty is put to flight and those who suffer from any illness will be restored to health," the text states.

== Death and aftermath ==
Arthur Dee, having fathered six sons and six daughters, died in September or October 1651 and was buried in St George's Church, Tombland, Norwich. Most of his alchemical manuscripts and books were bequeathed to Sir Thomas Browne.

In the early 20th century, Rasputin stole a number of Arthur Dee's Russian translations of his father's writings. These were later reclaimed by the Romanov family and returned to the Imperial Library in Moscow.
