= Jane Dee =

English gentlewoman and lady-in-waiting

Jane Dee (née Fromond) (1555–1604/5) was an English gentlewoman and lady-in-waiting whose married life is documented in the journals of her husband, the philosopher, occultist, and mathematician John Dee.

Dee was born to Bartholomew Fromond (or Fromonds) in Cheam in Surrey, England. Before her marriage to John Dee, she was a lady-in-waiting in the entourage of the Countess of Lincoln at the court of Queen Elizabeth I. Her court connections to Elizabeth and to other ladies in waiting may have significantly helped her husband secure patronage.

== Family background ==
Jane was the daughter of Bartholomew Fromond (or Fromonds) in Cheam in Surrey, England, and his wife Elizabeth Mynne, the daughter of Nicholas Mynne and the sister of Nicholas Mynne, and the aunt of Nicholas Mynne. Elizabeth Mynne's mother was Joan Merston (d. 31 October 1540), daughter and co-heiress of William Marston of Horton, Surrey, by his wife Beatrix Barlee. After Nicholas Mynne's death in 1528 his widow Joan remarried to become the first wife of William Saunders. Joan's sister was Ursula Marston (died c.1564), whose step-daughter, Margery Golding, married John de Vere, 16th Earl of Oxford as his second (by some counting third) wife, and was the mother of his son and heir, Edward de Vere, 17th Earl of Oxford. Ursula's son, Henry Golding (d.1576), was steward of the household to the selfsame 16th Earl after his sister's marriage. Ursula was also the mother of Arthur Golding.

== Marriage ==
Jane married John Dee in 1578 when she was 23 and he was 51. Dee was a noted natural philosopher who was particularly interested in divination, Hermetic philosophy and alchemy.

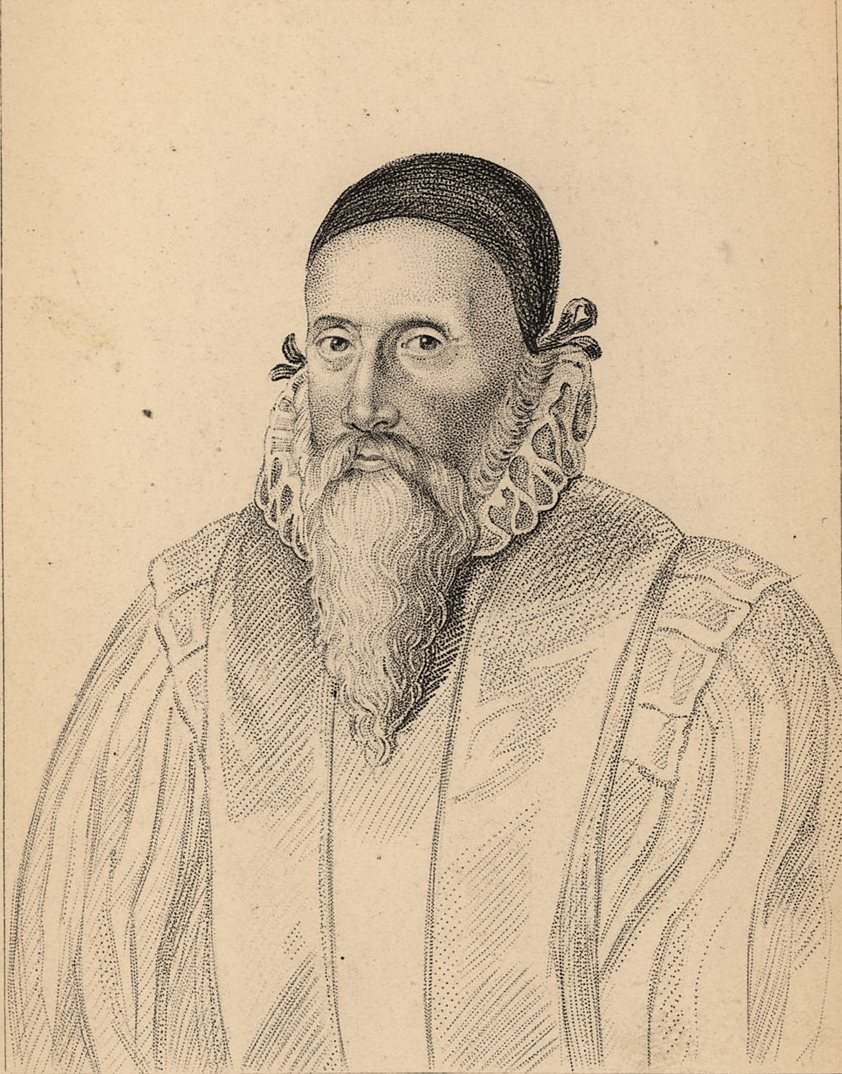
John Dee

He served as an astronomical and medical advisor to Queen Elizabeth and traveled throughout Europe, studying and advising other European nobles. After their marriage, Jane moved to Dee's home at Mortlake, south-west of London.

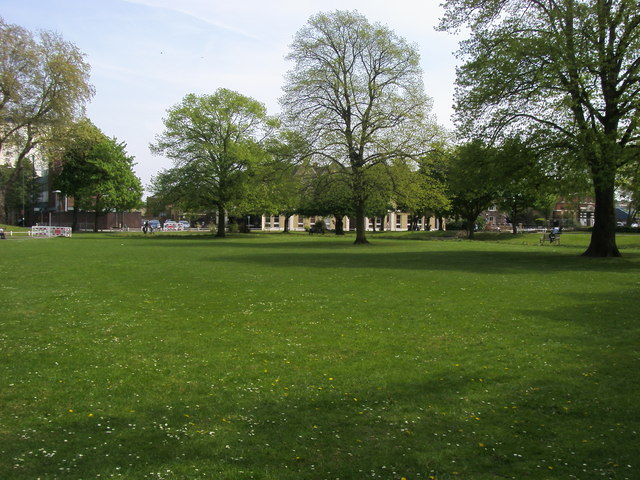
Mortlake Green

They had a large household of family and servants which Jane had a large role in managing, as well as frequent visitors who collaborated with John on a variety of experiments which he conducted in their home. Jane and their children also travelled with Dee to Poland in 1584 to work for Albertus Laski, a Polish nobleman. She had a son while in Kraków, waiting to join her husband in Prague.

We know a great deal about Jane Dee because of the detailed diaries and records kept by her husband. Dee recorded interactions between himself and his wife, arguments, and many details of their household. Such detail about the daily life of a sixteenth-century woman is extremely rare.

== Involvement in experimentation ==
Dee's diaries record Jane's involvement in his scientific investigations. He recorded her menstrual cycles, their sexual relations and the births of their children, as well as investigating their miscarried child in an effort to better understand reproduction. In 1582, Dee began to attempt communications with angels with a new associate, Edward Kelley, who acted as a scryer. Jane distrusted Kelley from the start, and Dee records several instances of friction between his wife and associate. When Kelley married a young wife, Joanna Cooper, and, according to Dee, neglected her, this may have worsened Jane and Kelley's relationship, since Jane sympathised with Joanna.

Nevertheless, in 1585, Jane sought Kelley's help as she attempted to communicate with these angels. She asked them about her family's precarious financial situation and asked for help and reassurance. Dee's papers record her petition:

We desire, God, of his greate and infinite mercies to grant us the helpe of His hevenly mynisters, that we may by them be directed how or by whom to be ayded and released in this neccessitie for meate and drinke for us and for our familie, wherewith we stand at this instant much oppressed.

Jane took an even more involved role in Dee's experimentation in 1587, when the Dees and Kelleys were both living in Třeboň. Kelley claimed to have communication from the angelic visitors Madimi and Ill that Dee and Kelley should exchange wives in the interest of furthering their philosophical partnership. Dee initially objected to the arrangement but was convinced by the insistent urging of the angel through Kelley. When informed of the angels' suggested arrangement, Jane Dee objected strenuously and 'fell a weeping and trembling for a quarter of an hour' but John convinced her that it was God's will that the men share everything. Jane and John and Edward Kelley and his wife, Joanna, soon signed an agreement and the physical relationships seem to have been consummated soon after. Some historians have speculated that Jane's son Theodore, born in 1588, may have been Kelley's and that his name was chosen to reference his father.

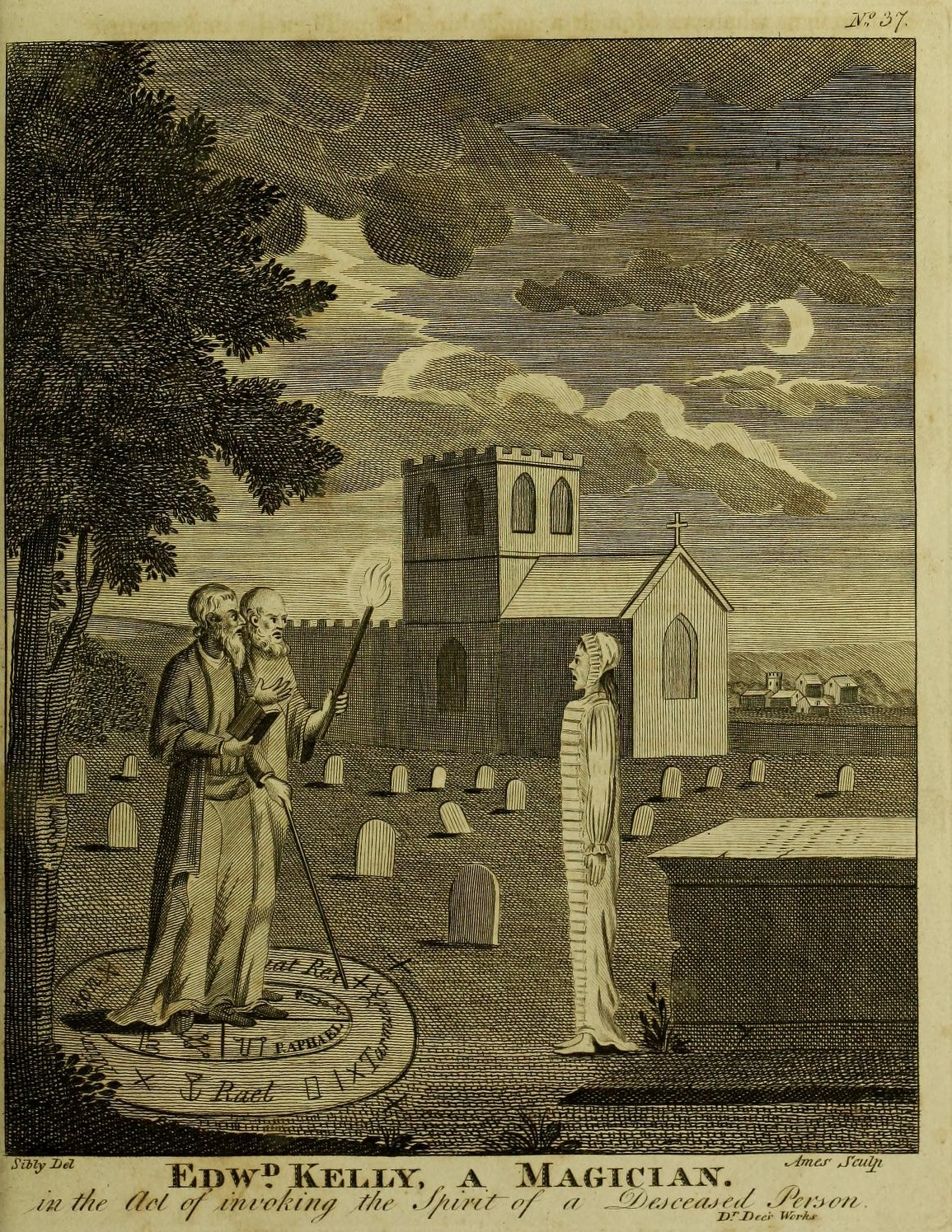
A Magician originally by Ebenezer Sibley

Dee and Kelley's conversations with angels ceased after this communication, and their close collaboration ended in 1589 when Dee and his family returned to England.

== Later life and death ==
After their return to England, Dee continued to record details about Jane, including their sexual activity and frequent cryptic notes, written in Greek meaning 'Jane had them'. The meaning of these notes is not certain, but they have been interpreted as meaning that Jane had dreams or visions. Jane gave birth to three daughters in this period: Madinia in 1590, Frances in 1592, and Margaret in 1595. Dee secured a post as warden of the collegiate church in Manchester and Jane and their children moved there with him in 1596. Jane died of the bubonic plague in Manchester in 1605 and was buried at Manchester Cathedral.

== Children ==
Jane was John's second or third wife, but the first with whom he had children. The couple had eight children together: four sons named Michael, Theodore, Arthur and Rowland and four daughters named Madinia, Frances, Margaret and Katherine. Michael (d. 1594), Theodore (d. 1601) and Margaret (d. 1603) predeceased their mother. Madinia and Frances may have died of the same bubonic plague as their mother in 1604–5.
