= KEF (disambiguation) =

KEF is a British loudspeaker manufacturer.

KEF may also refer to:

- Keflavík International Airport's IATA code
- Research England's Knowledge Exchange Framework

== See also ==
- Kef (disambiguation)
