= Psychomagia =

Studio album by Abraxas
- Released: February 2014
- Recorded: December 2 & 3, 2013 at Orange Sound, NJ
- Genre: Avant-garde, jazz, rock
- Length: 44:06
- Label: Tzadik; 8313
- Producer: John Zorn

Abraxas chronology
Abraxas: Book of Angels Volume 19 (2012)	Psychomagia (2014)

John Zorn chronology
The Hermetic Organ Vol. 2 (2014)	Psychomagia (2014)	The Alchemist (2014)

Psychomagia is the second album by Abraxas, led by Shanir Ezra Blumenkranz, performing compositions written by John Zorn, which was recorded in December 2013 and released on the Tzadik label.

== Reception ==
Professional ratings
Review scores
Source	Rating
Free Jazz Collective	4/5 stars

Martin Schray stated "these tracks are true Zorn compositions interwoven with Near Eastern melodies, western soundscapes and jazzy wackiness and Abraxas play these pieces with the abrasive, breathtaking energy of a monstrous jam session. The musicians never consider technical skills as ends in themselves, they always serve the compositions. Psychomagia is a High Mass for guitar freaks, fans of the music of Frank Zappa and for those who like the harsher sides of Bill Frisell and Marc Ribot". New York Music Daily stated "On one hand, this album is so tuneful that fans of traditional surf music are going to love it; at the same time, it’s so deliciously evil in places that the most cynical Yo La Tengo diehards might be caught drooling".

== Track listing ==
All compositions by John Zorn

1. "Metapsychomagia" - 7:31
2. "Sacred Emblems" - 3:02
3. "Circe" - 6:03
4. "Squaring the Circle" - 5:51
5. "Celestial Mechanism" - 2:32
6. "Evocation of the Triumphant Beast" - 6:25
7. "Four Rivers" - 3:54
8. "The Nameless God" - 4:35
9. "Anima Mundi" - 4:14

== Personnel ==
- Shanir Ezra Blumenkranz - bass
- Aram Bajakian, Eyal Maoz - guitar
- Kenny Grohowski - drums
