= Doug Balliett =

American composer and double bassist

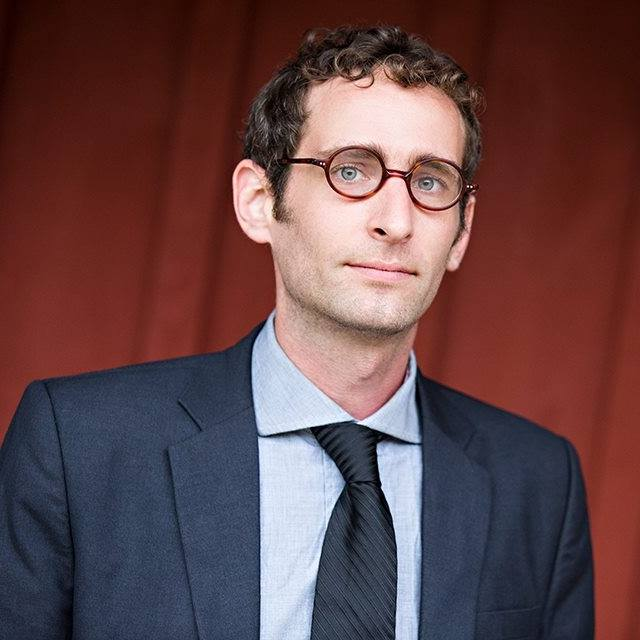

Background information
- Genres: Baroque, early music, contemporary classical music
- Occupations: Composer, double bassist, poet
- Website: dougballiett.nyc

Doug Balliett is an American composer, double bassist, and poet based in New York City. He has taught Baroque double bass and violone at the Juilliard School since 2017. Since 2020 he has been composer-in-residence at St. Mary's Roman Catholic Church on the Lower East Side of Manhattan, where he writes new liturgical music each week for Theotokos, an ensemble of vocalists and early-music specialists that he leads. In 2026, he received his first Grammy Award nomination, for his playing on Reginald Mobley's album Solitude.

== Early life and education ==
Balliett grew up in the Boston area; his identical twin brother, Brad Balliett, is a bassoonist. He entered Harvard University in 2001 and left after his junior year to become assistant principal bass of the San Antonio Symphony, completing his bachelor's degree in 2007. In 2010 he entered the historical performance program at the Juilliard School, where he studied Baroque bass with Robert Nairn, graduating in 2012. He was subsequently a fellow of Carnegie Hall's Ensemble ACJW (now Ensemble Connect).

== Performance ==
Balliett performs on both modern and period instruments. Early Music America described him in 2024 as "America's most in-demand Baroque bassist". He is a member of the period-instrument ensembles ACRONYM and Ruckus, of which he is a founding member, and plays bass with the American Modern Opera Company (AMOC). He appears regularly with Les Arts Florissants, including at William Christie's summer festival in Thiré, France. In 2017, Juilliard appointed him professor of Baroque bass, succeeding his former teacher Nairn.

Balliett performs on Solitude, an album by the countertenor Reginald Mobley with guitarist Brandon Acker, which was nominated for Best Classical Solo Vocal Album at the 69th Annual Grammy Awards; the nomination, announced in November 2026, was Balliett's first.

== Composition ==
Balliett's music often combines period instruments and Baroque forms with contemporary idioms, including hip-hop and spoken word set to his own poetry. As composer-in-residence of the ensemble New Vintage Baroque in 2013–14, he wrote five "rap cantatas" on myths from Ovid's Metamorphoses; reviewing the first, based on the myth of Diana and Actaeon, The New York Times praised its "emotive precision" and "contemporary twists". The Ovid cantatas became a recurring strand of his work: they formed part of his 2018 composer residency at the Spoleto Festival USA, and during the COVID-19 pandemic Les Arts Florissants recorded six of them for streaming. His other vocal music includes settings of Elizabethan poetry and T. S. Eliot written for the chamber ensemble The Colonials, of which he was a member.

His first opera, Gawain and the Green Knight, a two-hour setting of the Arthurian tale, was premiered by ACRONYM in the undercroft of St. Mary's Church in 2019 and has been revived there annually on New Year's Eve. His second opera, Rome Is Falling, received its workshop premiere from AMOC at the 2022 Ojai Music Festival; in The New Yorker, Alex Ross noted the "riotous, pop-flavored eclecticism of Doug Balliett's mini-opera".

With the bass-baritone Davóne Tines and Clay Zeller-Townson of Ruckus, Balliett created What Is Your Hand in This?, a program marking the 250th anniversary of the Declaration of Independence through American music ranging from Revolutionary-era anthems to Sam Cooke, in arrangements mostly by Balliett. It premiered in Washington, D.C., in January 2026.

== Theotokos ==
Since autumn 2020, Balliett has been composer-in-residence at St. Mary's Roman Catholic Church on the Lower East Side, where he writes new liturgical settings each week for Theotokos, a rotating group of New York City vocalists and early-music specialists, and leads four Masses a week in three languages. William Christie appeared as a guest harpsichordist at a Theotokos Mass in November 2023. The ensemble has also performed outside the church, including on Gotham Early Music Scene's Midtown Concerts series and in Relics & Martyrs, presented by Death of Classical in the crypt of the Cathedral of St. John the Divine in October 2025.
