= There Were Flowers Also in Hell =

Studio album by Aram Bajakian
- Released: January 20, 2014
- Recorded: March 8, 2013
- Studio: The Bunker, Brooklyn, NY
- Genre: Avant-garde; jazz; World music
- Length: 46:23
- Label: Sanasar
- Producer: Aram Bajakian; Shahzad Ismaily

Aram Bajakian chronology
Aram Bajakian's Kef (2011)	There Were Flowers Also in Hell (2014)	Music Inspired by the Color of Pomegranates (2015)

There Were Flowers Also in Hell is the debut album by guitarist Aram Bajakian.

== Reception ==
Professional ratings
Review scores
Source	Rating
PopMatters	9/10 stars
Robert Christgau	A−

The PopMatters review by Sean Murphy observed " it is a testament of Bajakian's love affair with his instrument. The inspirations he has absorbed infuse practically every second of this recording, but the sum total is anything but reductive. This album contains multitudes, and they are original as they are exhilarating. This is not jazz, nor is it necessarily rock or blues; it's a reflection of the mind and soul of the man who made it, like all great art must be. As such, it is also a reflection of the frenzied times we live in: the turmoil, apathy and information overload, yet it prevails as an antidote for the very urgencies it addresses. The best instrumental albums are always soundtracks. They are soundtracks to the worlds they create, and his second album is the soundtrack of Aram Bajakian's world, right now. We are witnessing the evolution of a significant talent, and we should anticipate important work from him for many years".

Robert Christgau said "Every track singular, every track strong".

Premier Guitar stated "The record reveals Bajakian as a sardonic composer, a masterly improviser, and a purveyor of excellent tones who finds new wrinkles in one of the most traditional musical forms".

The New York Music Daily review said, "It’s a feral, deliciously abrasive instrumental rock album, more informed by the blues than it is actually bluesy (although Bajakian is a strong and thoughtful blues player) ... Bajakian has made a lot of great music in recent years but this is some of his most interesting and adrenalizing – it’s one of the best instrumental rock records of recent years, hands down".

== Track listing ==
All compositions by Aram Bajakian except where noted

1. "Texas Cannonball" – 3:54
2. "Lou Tone" – 6:05
3. "Requiem For 5 Pointz" (Aram Bajakian, Jerome Jennings, Shahzad Ismaily) – 3:31
4. "Orbisonian" – 3:50
5. "Sweet Blue Eyes" – 3:38
6. "Rent Party" – 4:54
7. "Medicaid Lullaby" – 4:34
8. "Labor on 57th" – 5:50
9. "Japanese Love Ballad" – 3:00
10. "The Kids Don't Want to Sleep" (Bajakian, Jennings, Ismaily) – 3:15
11. "For Julia" – 3:58

== Personnel ==
- Aram Bajakian – guitar
- Shahzad Ismaily − bass
- Jerome Jennings – drums
