= Abraxas: Book of Angels Volume 19 =

Studio album by Shanir Ezra Blumenkranz
- Released: July 2012
- Recorded: 2012
- Genres: Avant-garde, jazz, rock
- Length: 44:06
- Labels: Tzadik; 8302
- Producer: John Zorn

Abraxas chronology
Abraxas: Book of Angels Volume 19 (2012)	Psychomagia (2014)

Book of Angels chronology
Pruflas: Book of Angels Volume 18 (2011)	Abraxas: Book of Angels Volume 19 (2012)	Tap: Book of Angels Volume 20 (2013)

Abraxas: Book of Angels Volume 19 is the debut album led by Shanir Ezra Blumenkranz performing compositions from John Zorn's second Masada book, "The Book of Angels".

== Reception ==
Professional ratings
Review scores
Source	Rating
Free Jazz Collective	4/5 stars
Uki-Satori.com	4/5 stars

Paul Acquaro stated "Shanir Ezra Blumenkranz's interpretations of John Zorn's second Masada book is a raucous one that is full of energy and urgency... There is a certain consistency to the music, there is a certain amount of cohesion that connects this book of songs, and there is a wonderful contrast between the delicately melodic and thrillingly thrashing".

Griffin Vacheron called the album "the most high-powered, vivacious, and at times frighteningly dynamic entry in the series" stating "Blumenkranz and Co. really manage to bring their own unique fire to the table while still preserving the overall Masada vibe, and for that they should be commended".

== Track listing ==
All compositions by John Zorn

1. "Domos" - 3:59
2. "Tse'an" - 4:09
3. "Nachmiel" - 3:35
4. "Yaasriel" - 5:21
5. "Muriel" - 3:26
6. "Maspiel" - 5:50
7. "Aupiel" - 3:43
8. "Nahuriel" - 4:57
9. "Biztha" - 3:37
10. "Zaphiel" - 5:21

== Personnel ==
- Shanir Ezra Blumenkranz - gimbri
- Aram Bajakian, Eyal Maoz - guitar
- Kenny Grohowski - drums
