= Eyal Maoz =

American jazz musician

Eyal Maoz אייל מעוז
- Born: 1969 (age 56–57); Haifa, Israel
- Origin: United States
- Genres: Rock; Jazz; Avant-garde; Electronic; Jewish music; Middle Eastern music
- Occupations: Guitarist; Bandleader; Solo performer; Composer
- Instrument: Guitar

Eyal Maoz (Hebrew: אייל מעוז; born 1969, Haifa) is an Israeli-born American guitarist, bandleader, solo performer, and composer. His music has been described as a synthesis of rock, jazz and avant-garde, tinged with deep electronic and radical Jewish-middle-eastern music.

He leads a number of original music ensembles, including Edom, Dimyon, and Crazy Slavic Band. He also co-leads the Maoz-Sirkis Duet, the Maoz-Masaoka Duet (with koto player Miya Masaoka) and Hypercolor (with Lukas Ligeti and James Ilgenfritz), and is a guest member of John Zorn's Cobra.

Eyal's ensembles have performed at major music festivals worldwide, such as the Montreal International Jazz Festival, NYC 2007 Winter Jazz Fest, Brooklyn BAM Next Festival, Verizon Jazz Festival, the New York Jewish Music and Heritage Festival, Florida Music Harvest, The Jewzapalooza Festival in NYC and many more.

His music was featured in the movie Keepers of Eden by Yoram Porath, Israeli's Cinema History documentary by Raphaël Nadjari, as well as at the MTV show Undress. WNYC/NPR recently interviewed him and dedicated a 90-minute program to his music.

Eyal started to explore jazz, rock and avant-garde music at an early age. He led the Lemon Juice Quartet which performed regularly at the Red Sea International Jazz Festival, released three CDs and was heralded for their CD Peasant Songs, a version of Béla Bartók and Erik Satie's music on Piadrum Records.

Eyal's collaboration with long-time childhood friend and drummer Asaf Sirkis has resulted in two duo CDs; the most recent "Elementary Dialogues" released in June 2009 by Ayler Records (France).

His Jewish music acoustic ensemble, Dimyon, has earned critical acclaim after performances in Israel and Italy. After a solo tour in Austria, Eyal completed a guitar tour in China,

Hope and Destruction, his second CD on Tzadik Records, with his ensemble Edom was released in 2009. The group's debut CD, featured Maoz with, John Medeski, Shanir Ezra Blumenkranz, and Ben Perowsky.

== Discography ==
- Edom (Tzadik, 2005)
- Hope and Destruction (Tzadik, 2009)
- Elementary Dialogues (Ayler, 2009) with Asaf Sirkis

With 9Volt

- Open Circuit (OutNow, 2012)

With the Lemon Juice Quartet

- Peasant Songs (Piadrum, 2002)

With John Zorn

- Abraxas: Book of Angels Volume 19 (Tzadik, 2012) with Shanir Ezra Blumenkranz
- Psychomagia (Tzadik, 2014) with Abraxas
