= Reginald Mobley =

American countertenor (born 1977)

Reginald Mobley (born 21 October 1977) is an African-American countertenor. He was raised singing jazz and gospel music, but trained in the classical repertoire. He is best known for singing the works of Henry Purcell and Johann Sebastian Bach. In 2023 he sang at the coronation of Charles III as well as at the BBC Proms. He lives in Boston, Massachusetts.

== Early life and musical education ==
Mobley was born in Gainesville, Florida, where he attended Eastside High School. As a boy he sang at Gainesville's Bethel Seventh-day Adventist Church, and he discovered Bach while a high school student. He was also interested in art, and won an art scholarship to Davidson College in North Carolina. However a bout of carpal tunnel syndrome led him to change artistic direction and he moved to the Seventh-day Adventist-affiliated Oakwood University in Huntsville, Alabama. There he studied tenor singing. He later studied at the University of Florida in Gainesville with Jean Ronald LaFond and at the Florida State University in Tallahassee with Roy Delp.

== Performance history ==
Mobley has performed with the Baroque ensemble Apollo's Fire, and is a regular guest with the Philharmonia Baroque Orchestra, the Washington Bach Consort, Seraphic Fire, and Agave Baroque. With the latter, Mobley created the project Peace in our Time – music of love and loss in the shadow of the Thirty Years' War, which included concerts for the San Francisco Early Music Society and a new recording. Mobley also recorded a collection of spirituals with Agave Baroque entitled American Originals that was nominated for a 2022 Grammy Award. His first solo album, Because (May 2023), is also a selection of spirituals, performed in collaboration with pianist Baptiste Trotignon.

Mobley has also taken roles in several musical theatre productions, including the title role in Rupert Holmes' Mystery of Edwin Drood, and Jacey Squires in Meredith Willson's The Music Man. In addition he has performed many cabaret shows and sets of jazz standards and torch songs in jazz clubs in and around Tokyo, Japan.

He made his Australian debut in 2025, touring with the Bach Akademie Australia and performing at the Blackheath Chamber Music Festival.

== Research into music by forgotten black composers ==
Mobley holds the position of visiting artist for diversity outreach with Apollo's Fire. He has a strong interest in researching and performing the work of forgotten black composers, particularly Ignatius Sancho.

In 2019 he collaborated with composer Jonathan Woody in developing and performing a choral piece entitled Nigra Sum Sed Formosa: A Fantasia on Microaggressions (Latin for I Am Black but Beautiful).

In March 2020, he became the first-ever programming consultant for the Handel and Haydn Society, working to diversify the group's repertoire. The job evolved from his earlier annual projects with the group, beginning with organizing a 2015 program along with the Museum of African American History in Boston.
