= Aram Bajakian's Kef =

Studio album by Aram Bajakian
- Released: 2011
- Recorded: November 2010
- Studio: The Bunker, Brooklyn, NY
- Genre: Avant-garde; jazz; World music
- Length: 46:48
- Label: Tzadik
- Producer: Aram Bajakian; Shanir Ezra Blumenkranz

Aram Bajakian chronology
Aram Bajakian's Kef (2011)	There Were Flowers Also in Hell (2014)

Aram Bajakian's Kef is the debut album by guitarist Aram Bajakian.

== Reception ==
Professional ratings
Review scores
Source	Rating
All About Jazz	4.5/5 stars
PopMatters	9/10 stars

All About Jazz reviewer Chris May said, "With Kef, Bajakian is exploring his Armenian musical heritage through its US offshoot, kef—a style developed by the Armenian Diaspora ...The dozen tunes are either written by Bajakian or arranged by him from traditional material. It is an exciting mélange, which preserves kef's roots in providing music for dance, and broadens its stylistic parameters".

The PopMatters review by Sean Murphy observed "The absence of drums is novel and audacious, but considering how much some of this material shreds, it is almost revelatory ... There are no unsatisfactory tracks to be found here, and while some may dazzle or impress more than others ... suffice to say Kef is as extraordinary an album as I can recall listening to in a very long time".

== Track listing ==
All compositions by Aram Bajakian except where noted

1. "Pear Tree" – 2:36
2. "Sepastia" – 3:23
3. "Laz Bar" (Traditional) – 4:27
4. "Sumlinian" – 5:17
5. "Wroclaw" – 4:45
6. "Karasalama" (Traditional) – 5:16
7. "Hayastan" – 5:02
8. "Raki" – 3:15
9. "Pineta" – 2:30
10. "Shish" – 2:09
11. "48 Days" – 2:28
12. "La Rota" – 5:40

== Personnel ==
- Aram Bajakian – electric guitar, acoustic guitar
- Tom Swafford – violin
- Shanir Ezra Blumenkranz - acoustic bass
