= The Alchemist (John Zorn album) =

Studio album by John Zorn
- Released: February 2014
- Genre: Avant-garde, contemporary classical music
- Length: 33:04
- Label: Tzadik TZ 8314
- Producer: John Zorn

John Zorn chronology
Psychomagia (2014)	The Alchemist (2014)	Fragmentations, Prayers and Interjections (2014)

The Alchemist is an album composed by John Zorn and featuring two new compositions, one for string quartet and another for female voices, recorded in New York City in 2013 and released on the Tzadik label in February 2014.

== Track listing ==
All compositions by John Zorn

1. "The Alchemist" – 20:08
2. "Earthspirit" – 12:56

== Personnel ==
- Jesse Mills, Pauline Kim – violin (track 1)
- David Fulmer – viola (track 1)
- Jay Campbell – cello (track 1)
- Jane Sheldon, Kirsten Sollek, Mellissa Hughes – vocals (track 2)

=== Production ===
- Marc Uselli – engineer, audio mixer
- John Zorn and Kazunori Sugiyama – producers
